= List of medical schools in Africa =

The following is a list of medical schools in Africa. It includes public and private universities and colleges with medical institutes, departments or faculties.

== Algeria ==
- University of Algiers (Université de Algiers – Benyoucef Benkhedda)
- University of Annaba (Université Badji Mokhtar de Annaba)
- University of Batna 2 (Université Mostefa Ben Boulaïd)
- Université of Constantine (Université Fréres Mentouri)
- University of Mostaganem (Université Abdelhamid Ibn Badis)
- University of Oran (Université Ahmed Ben bella 1)
- Université de Sétif (Université Ferhat Abbas de Setif)
- University of Tizi Ouzou (Université Mouloud Mammeri de Tizi Ouzou)
- University of Blida (Université Saad Dahlab)
- University of Ouargla (Université Kasdi Merbah Ouargla)
- Djillali Liabès University of Sidi Bel Abbès

== Angola ==
- Agostinho Neto University, Faculty of Medicine (Universidade Agostinho Neto, Faculdade de Medicina)
- Jean Piaget University of Angola, Faculdade de ciências da saúde, curso de medicina (Universidade Jean Piaget de Angola)

== Benin ==
- Université des Sciences de la Santé de Cotonou
- Université fr Médecine de Parakou
- Richmond International University Benin, Houdegbe North American universite
- Crown Point International School of Health Sciences And Technology(crownpointschools.com.ng

== Botswana ==
- University of Botswana, School of Medicine

== Burkina Faso ==
- Institut Supérieur des Sciences de la Santé
- Unité de Formation et de Recherche en Sciences de la Santé
- Université Saint Thomas d'Aquin

== Burundi ==
- Université Espoir d'Afrique
- Université de Ngozi
- Université du Burundi

== Cameroon ==
- Faculty of medicine and biomedical sciences Yaounde
- Faculty of medicine and pharmaceutical sciences Douala
- Faculty of Health sciences Buea
- Université des Montagnes Bangante
- Institut Superieur de Technologie Medicales Nkololoum, Yaounde
- Faculty of Health Sciences Bamenda
- School of Health Sciences|HIBMAT University Institute of Buea-HUIB
- Catholic University of Cameroon (CATUC) Kumbo

== Republic of the Congo ==
- Faculte des sciences de la santé (Brazzaville)

== Democratic Republic of the Congo ==
- Université de Kinshasa Faculté de Médecine
- Université de Lubumbashi Faculté de Médecine
- Université de Kisangani Faculté de Médecine et Pharmacie
- Universite de Goma Faculte de Medecine
- Universite Officielle de Bukavu Faculte de Medecine et Pharmacie
- Universite Protestante du Congo Faculte de Medecine
- Université Shalom Bunia Faculté de Médecine
- Université Catholique du Graben Faculté de Médecine
- Universite Evangelique en Afrique Faculte de Medecine
- Université Notre Dame du Kasai Faculte de Medecine
- Universite de Kindu Faculte de Medecine
- Universite de Bandundu Faculte de Medecine
- Université Kongo Faculté de Médecine
- Université Simon Kimbangu Faculté de médecine
- Université libre des Pays des grands lacs (ULPGL) Faculté de médecine.

== Ivory Coast ==
- Université Félix Houphouët-Boigny
- Université Alassane Ouattara

== Egypt ==
- Ain Shams University El-Demerdash Faculty of Medicine
- Ain Shams National University Faculty of Medicine
- Al-Azhar University
  - Faculty of Medicine for Boys
  - Faculty of Medicine for Girls
  - Assiut Faculty of Medicine for Boys
  - Assiut Faculty of Medicine for Girls
  - Damietta Faculty of Medicine
- Alexandria University Faculty of Medicine
- Alexandria National University Faculty of Medicine
- Arab Academy for Science, Technology & Maritime Transport College of Medicine
- Arish University Faculty of Medicine
- Armed Forces College of Medicine
- Assiut University Faculty of Medicine
- Assiut National University Faculty of Medicine
- Aswan University Faculty of Medicine
- Badr University in Cairo School of Medicine
- Badya University School of Medicine
- Benha University College of Human Medicine
- Benha National University Factulty of Medicine
- Beni Suef University Faculty of Medicine
- Beni Suef National University Faculty of Medicine
- Cairo University Kasr Alainy School of Medicine
- Capital University Faculty of Medicine
- Damietta University Faculty of Medicine
- Delta University for Science and Technology Faculty of Medicine
- East Port Said National University Faculty of Medicine
- Fayoum University Faculty of Medicine
- Galala University Faculty of Medicine
- Horus University Faculty of Medicine
- Kafrelsheikh University Faculty of Medicine
- King Salman International University Faculty of Medicine
- Luxor University Faculty of Medicine
- Mansoura University Faculty of Medicine
- Mansoura National University Faculty of Medicine
- Memphis University School of Medicine
- Menoufia University Faculty of Medicine
- Menoufia National University Faculty of Medicine and Sugery
- Merit University Faculty of Medicine
- Minia University Faculty of Medicine
- Minia National University Faculty of Medicine
- Misr University for Science and Technology College of Medicine
- Modern University for Technology and Information Faculty of Medicine
- Nahda University in Beni Suef Faculty of Medicine
- Newgiza University School of Medicine
- New Ismailia National University Faculty of Medicine
- New Mansoura University Faculty of Medicine
- New Valley University Faculty of Medicine
- October 6 University Faculty of Medicine
- Port Said University Faculty of Medicine
- Sohag University Faculty of Medicine
- South Valley University Qena Faculty of Medicine
- South Valley National University Qena Faculty of Medicine
- Suez University Faculty of Medicine
- Suez Canal University Faculty of Medicine
- Tanta University Faculty of Medicine
- University of East Capital Faculty of Medicine
- Zagazig University
  - Faculty of Medicine
  - Faqous Faculty of Medicine
- Zagazig National University Faculty of Medicine

== Eritrea ==
- Orotta School of Medicine, Asmara, Eritrea

== Ethiopia ==
- Adama University, Asella School of Medicine
- Adama Hospital Medical College(AHMC), Adama, Ethiopia
- Addis Ababa University
- Africa medical college
- Bahirdar University College of Medicine and Health Science
- Bethel Medical College
- Debrebirhan University College of Health Science and Medicine
- Gondar College of Medical Sciences
- Haramaya University
- Hawassa University
- Hayat Medical College
- Jimma University
- Madda Walabu University Goba Referral Hospital
- Mekelle University
- MyungSung Medical College
- St. Paul's Hospital Millennium Medical College
- Wolaita Sodo University
- Arbaminch university college of medicine and health science

== Gabon ==
- Faculté de Médecine et des Sciences de la Santé (FMSS)

== Ghana ==
- Accra College of Medicine, Accra
- Kwame Nkrumah University of Science and Technology School of Medical Sciences, Kumasi
- School of Medicine and Health Sciences, University for Development Studies, Tamale
- University of Cape Coast School of Medical Sciences, Cape Coast
- University of Ghana Medical School, Accra
- University of Health and Allied Sciences School of Medicine, Ho
- Family Health Medical School, Teshie
- College of Health-Yamfo School of Medicine, Ba

== Kenya ==
There are twelve approved public and private medical school in Kenya according to the Kenya Medical Practitioners and Dentists Council:

- University of Nairobi Medical School
- Moi University Medical School
- Kenyatta University Medical School
- Egerton University Medical School
- Kenya Methodist University Medical School
- Aga Khan University Medical School
- JKUAT Medical School
- Mount Kenya University Medical School
- Uzima University School of Medicine
- Maseno University School of Medicine
- Masinde Muliro University of Science and Technology School of Medicine
- Kisii University School of Medicine

== Liberia ==
- University of Liberia A. M. Dogliotti School of Medicine

== Libya ==
- Libyan International Medical University
- Omar Al-Mukhtar University
- University of Benghazi
- University of Tripoli

== Malawi ==
- University of Malawi College of Medicine

== Mauritius ==
- Anna Medical College and Research Centre
- Padmashree Dr D Y Patil Medical College
- Sir Seewoosagur Ramgoolam Medical College
- University of Mauritius

== Mauritania ==
- Faculte de medecine de Nouckchott

== Morocco ==
- Faculty of Medicine and Pharmacy of Casablanca, Hassan II University of Casablanca
- Faculty of Medicine and Pharmacy of Fez, Sidi Mohamed Ben Abdellah University
- Faculty of Medicine and Pharmacy of Marrakesh, Cadi Ayyad University
- Faculty of Medicine and Pharmacy of Rabat, Mohammed V University
- Faculty of Medicine and Pharmacy of Oujda, Mohammed First University
- Faculty of Medicine and Pharmacy of Tanger, Abdelmalek Essaâdi University
- Mohammed VI University of Health Sciences
- Private University of Marrakech
- Faculty of Medicine and Pharmacy of Agadir, Ibn Zohr University
- Al-Zahrawi International University of Health Sciences

== Mozambique ==
- Catholic University of Mozambique, Faculty of Medicine (Universidade Católica de Moçambique, Faculdade de Medicina)
- Eduardo Mondlane University, Faculty of Medicine (Universidade Eduardo Mondlane, Faculdade de Medicina)
- Lurio University, Health Science Faculty (Universidade Lurio, Faculdade de Ciências de Saúde)
- ISCTEM - Instituto Superior de Ciências e Tecnologia de Moçambique, School of Health Sciences
- Zambeze University, Health Science Faculty (Universidade Zambeze, Faculdade de Ciências de Saúde)

== Namibia ==
- UNAM School of Medicine of the University of Namibia, Faculty of Health Sciences.

== Nigeria ==
- Abia State University, Uturu
- Abubakar Tafawa Balewa University, Bauchi
- Afe Babalola
- University College of Medicine, Ado Ekiti, Ekiti.
- African College of Health College of Medicine, FCT
- Ahmadu Bello University, Zaria
- Ambrose Alli University College of Medicine, Ekpoma
- Babcock University, Ilishan Remo, Ogun State Nigeria
- Bayero University, Kano
- Benue State University, College of Health Sciences, Makurdi, Benue State.
- Chukwuemeka Odumegwu Ojukwu University College of Medicine, Anambra state
- Delta State University, Abraka
- Ebonyi State University, Abakaliki
- Edo University Iyamho, College of Health Science, Iyamho, Edo State.
- Ekiti State University, College of Medicine, Ado - Ekiti, Ekiti State.
- Enugu State University Of Science And Technology, College of Medicine, Parklane, Enugu.
- Godfrey Okoye University, Enugu.
- Igbinedion University, Okada, Edo State
- Ladoke Akintola University of Technology (Lautech), Ogbomosho, Oyo State
- Lagos State University, Ikeja, Lagos
- Madonna University, Elele, Rivers State
- Nnamdi Azikiwe University, Nnewi
- Obafemi Awolowo University, Ile-Ife
- Obafemi Awolowo College of Health Sciences, Olabisi Onabanjo University, Sagamu, Ogun State
- Osun State University, Osogbo, Osun state (Uniosun).
- University of Medical Sciences, Ondo City, Ondo State (UNIMED)
- University of Benin
- University of Calabar
- University of Ibadan
- University of medical Sciences, laje, Ondo
- University of Ilorin
- University of Jos
- University of Lagos, Idi-Araba
- University of Maiduguri
- University of Nigeria, Enugu
- University of Port Harcourt
- ((Bingham University)) Karu
- University of Uyo, Uyo
- Usmanu Danfodiyo University
- Bingham University Karu
- Bowen University, Iwo
- Imo state University Owerri
- Sani Zangon Daura College of Health Technology, Daura, Katsina State. (coheskat.edu.ng)
- Nile University of Nigeria, Abuja
- PAMO University of Medical Sciences, Iriebe, Port Harcourt Nigeria

== Rwanda ==
- University of Rwanda (UR) - College of Medicine and Health Sciences
- University of Global Health Equity (UGHE)
- Adventist University Of Central Africa-Adventsit School of Medicine (ASOME)
- University of Medical Sciencies and Technology (UMST-Rwanda)

== Senegal ==
- Université El Hadji Ibrahima Niasse, St. Christopher Iba Mar Diop College of Medicine (formerly St. Christopher's College of Medicine from 2000 to 2005)

== Seychelles ==
- The University of Seychelles American Institute of Medicine (USAIM) - The agreement between the Government of the Seychelles and the university was terminated at the end of January 2011. A grace period up to April 2013 was granted, which allowed enrolled students to complete their studies.

== Somalia ==
- Adal Medical University
- Gollis University
- Somali National University
- Salaam University
- Hargeisa University
- Amoud University
- Benadir University
- East Africa University
- Hope University
- Mogadishu University
- Somalia-Turkey Training and Research Hospital
- Baresan University
- East Africa University
- University of Somalia
- Somali International University
- University of Health Science in Bosaso
- Edna Adan University
- Frantz fanon university
- Plasma University
- Adan Adde International University

== South Africa ==
Institution	School	Founded	Location
University of Cape Town	Faculty of Health Sciences	1912	Cape Town
University of the Witwatersrand	Faculty of Health Sciences	1919	Johannesburg
University of the Free State	Faculty of Health Sciences	1969	Bloemfontein
University of KwaZulu-Natal	College of Health Sciences	1950	Durban, Pietermaritzburg
University of Pretoria	Faculty of Health Sciences	1943	Pretoria
University of Stellenbosch	Faculty of Medicine & Health Sciences	1955	Tygerberg Hospital, Western Cape
Walter Sisulu University	Faculty of Health Sciences	1985	Mthatha, Eastern Cape
Sefako Makgatho Health Sciences University	School of Medicine	2015	Ga-Rankuwa, Gauteng
University of Limpopo	Faculty of Health Sciences	2016	Mankweng, Limpopo
Nelson Mandela University	Faculty of Health Sciences	2021	Eastern Cape

== Tanzania ==
- Catholic University of Health and Allied Sciences
- Hubert Kairuki Memorial University
- Kilimanjaro Christian Medical University College
- Muhimbili University of Health and Allied Sciences
- St. Francis University College of Health and Allied Sciences
- University of Dodoma
- University of Dar es Salaam
- SHMS, State University of Zanzibar (SUZA)
- Kampala International University in Tanzania

== Tunisia ==
- University of Monastir, Faculty of Medicine of Monastir
- University of Sfax, Faculty of Medicine of Sfax
- University of Sousse, Faculty of Medicine of Sousse
- University of Tunis El Manar, Faculty of Medicine of Tunis
- University of Monastir, Faculty of Dental Medicine of Monastir

== Uganda ==
- Busitema University School of Medicine, Mbale
- Gulu University School of Medicine, Gulu
- Habib Medical School, Kibuli, Kampala
- International Health Sciences University, Muyenga, Kampala
- Kampala International University School of Health Sciences, Bushenyi
- Makerere University School of Medicine, Mulago, Kampala
- Mbarara University School of Medicine, Mbarara
- Uganda Martyrs University School of Medicine, St. Francis Hospital Nsambya, Kampala
- Kabale University School of Medicine, Kabale
- Soroti University School of Health Sciences, Soroti
- King Ceasor University School of Medicine, Kampala
- Uganda Christian University School of Medicine

== Zambia ==
- Lusaka Apex Medical University, Lusaka
- Cavendish University School of Medicine, Lusaka
- Copperbelt University School of Medicine, Ndola
- University of Zambia School of Medicine, Lusaka
- Mulungushi University School of Medicine, Livingstone
- livingstone International University for Tourism Excellence & Business Management Lusaka
- Texila American University - Zambia
- Levy Mwanawasa Medical University Lusaka
- Eden University of Medicine and Health Sciences Lusaka, Zambia

== Zimbabwe ==
- University of Zimbabwe College of Health Sciences
- Midlands State University Medical School
- National University of Science and Technology
- GZU (Simon mzenda school of medicine)
