= List of medical schools in Egypt =

This list of medical schools in Egypt includes current academic institutions which award a medical degree required for comprehensive practice as a physician in Egypt. There are 54 medical schools in Egypt, more than double the 25 that existed before 2019.

== Public Schools of Medicine ==
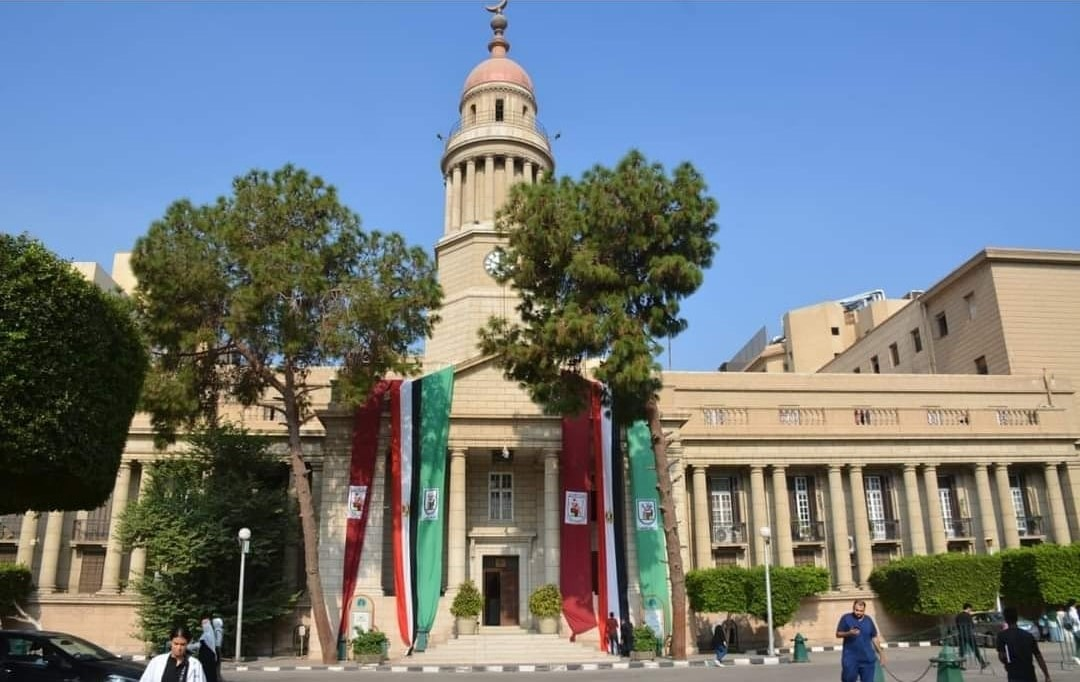
Kasr Alainy School of Medicine in Cairo University.

- Cairo University Kasr Alainy School of Medicine (1827)
- Alexandria University Faculty of Medicine (1942)
- Ain Shams University El-Demerdash Faculty of Medicine (1948)
- Assiut University Faculty of Medicine (1960)
- Mansoura University Faculty of Medicine (1962)
- Tanta University Faculty of Medicine (1962)
- Al-Azhar University (1964)
  - Faculty of Medicine for Boys
  - Faculty of Medicine for Girls
  - Assiut Faculty of Medicine for Boys
  - Assiut Faculty of Medicine for Girls
  - Damietta Faculty of Medicine
- Zagazig University (1970)
  - Faculty of Medicine
  - Faqous Faculty of Medicine
- Suez Canal University Faculty of Medicine (1981)
- Menoufia University Faculty of Medicine (1984)
- Minia University Faculty of Medicine (1984)
- South Valley University Qena Faculty of Medicine (1996)
- Benha University College of Human Medicine (2005)
- Beni Suef University Faculty of Medicine (2005)
- Fayoum University Faculty of Medicine (2005)
- Sohag University Faculty of Medicine (2006)
- Armed Forces College of Medicine (2013)
- Aswan University Faculty of Medicine (2013)
- Capital University Faculty of Medicine (2013)
- Kafrelsheikh University Faculty of Medicine (2013)
- Port Said University Faculty of Medicine (2013)
- Suez University Faculty of Medicine (2018)
- Arish University Faculty of Medicine (2021)
- Damietta University Faculty of Medicine (2021)
- Luxor University Faculty of Medicine (2021)
- New Valley University Faculty of Medicine (2021)

== Private Schools of Medicine ==
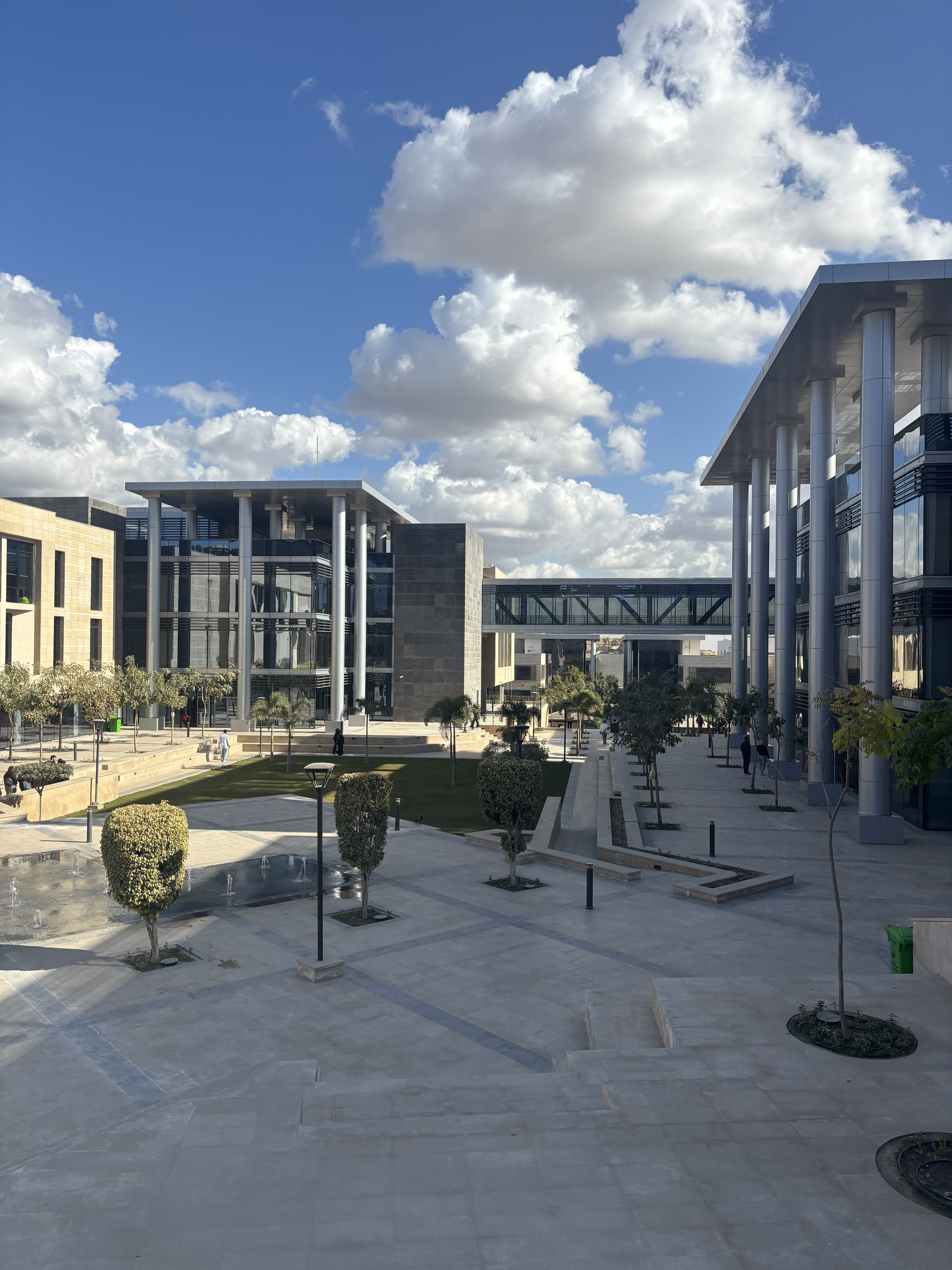
Newgiza University, School of Medicine

- Misr University for Science and Technology College of Medicine (1996)
- October 6 University Faculty of Medicine (1996)
- Newgiza University School of Medicine (2010)
- Badr University in Cairo School of Medicine (2019)
- Delta University for Science and Technology Faculty of Medicine (2019)
- Modern University for Technology and Information Faculty of Medicine (2019)
- Nahda University in Beni Suef Faculty of Medicine (2019)
- Merit University Faculty of Medicine (2020)
- Arab Academy for Science, Technology & Maritime Transport College of Medicine (2021)
- Horus University Faculty of Medicine (2021)
- Badya University School of Medicine (2024)
- Memphis University School of Medicine (2025)
- University of East Capital Faculty of Medicine (2025)

== National Schools of Medicine ==
- Galala University Faculty of Medicine (2020)
- King Salman International University Faculty of Medicine (2020)
- New Mansoura University Faculty of Medicine (2021)
- Alexandria National University Faculty of Medicine (2022)
- Assiut National University Faculty of Medicine (2022)
- Benha National University Faculty of Medicine (2022)
- East Port Said National University Faculty of Medicine (2022)
- Mansoura National University Faculty of Medicine (2022)
- Minia National University Faculty of Medicine (2022)
- New Ismailia National University College of Medicine (2022)
- South Valley National University Qena Faculty of Medicine (2022)
- Zagazig National University Faculty of Medicine (2022)
- Beni Suef National University Faculty of Medicine (2023)
- Menoufia National University Faculty of Medicine and Surgery (2023)
- Ain Shams National University Faculty of Medicine (2025)

== See also ==
- Education in Egypt
- List of Egyptian universities
