= List of Engineering Faculties in Egypt =

List of Engineering Faculties in Egypt:

- Faculty of Engineering, Cairo University.
- Faculty of Engineering, Ain Shams University.
- Faculty of Engineering, Alexandria University.
- Faculty of Engineering, Helwan University.
- Faculty of Engineering In Mataria, Helwan University.
- Faculty of Engineering, Benha University.
- Faculty of Engineering In Shobra, Benha University.
- Faculty of Electronic Engineering, Menoufia University
- Faculty of Engineering, Menoufia University
- Faculty of Engineering, Mansoura University
- Faculty of Engineering, Tanta University
- Faculty of Engineering, Zagazig University
- Faculty of Engineering, Suez Canal University
- Faculty of Petroleum Engineering and Mining, Suez University
- Faculty of Engineering, Assiut University
- Faculty of Engineering, Aswan University
- Faculty of Energy Engineering, Aswan University
- Faculty of Engineering, South Valley University
- Faculty of Engineering, Kafr Elsheikh University
- Faculty of Engineering, Port Said University
- Faculty of Engineering, Sohag University
- Faculty of Engineering, Minia University
- Faculty of Engineering, Fayoum University
- Faculty of Engineering, Beni Suef University
- Faculty of Engineering, Damietta University
- Faculty of Engineering, Egypt-Japan University of Science & Technology
- Faculty of Engineering, Egypt University of Informatics
- School of Engineering, Nile University
- Faculty of Engineering, French University In Egypt
- Faculty of Engineering, Galala University
- Faculty of Engineering, AlAlamein International University
- Faculty of Engineering, King Salman International University
- Faculty of Engineering, New Mansoura University
- College of Engineering, University of Science and Technology, Zewail City
- School of Engineering, The American University In Cairo.
- Faculty of Engineering, The German University In Cairo
- Faculty of Engineering, The German International University
- Faculty of Engineering, The British University In Egypt
- College of Engineering, The Arab Academy of Science, Technology Maritime Transport
- Faculty of Engineering, Hertfordshire University In Egypt
- College of Engineering, Misr University For Science & Technology
- Faculty of Engineering, Misr International University
- Faculty of Engineering, MSA University
- Faculty of Engineering, October 6 University
- Faculty of Engineering, Pharos University In Alexandria
- Faculty of Engineering, Badr University In Cairo
- Faculty of Engineering, European Universities In Egypt
- Faculty of Engineering, Canadian Universities In Egypt
- Faculty of Engineering, Coventry University
- Faculty of Engineering, Egyptian Russian University
