= List of universities in Egypt =

This is a list of universities in Egypt. The higher education sector of Egypt includes a number of state-funded, national and private universities.

== State-funded ==
University	Common abbreviation	Year established	Source
Ain Shams University	ASU	1950	
Al-Azhar University	AZU	975	
Alexandria University	ALEXU	1938	
Assiut University	AUN	1957	
Aswan University	ASWU	2012	
Banha University	BU	2005	
Beni-Suef University	BSU	2005	
Cairo University	CU	1908	
Capital University	HU	1975	
Damanhour University	DAU	2010	
Damietta University	DU	2012	
Fayoum University	FU	2005	
Kafrelsheikh University	KFS	2006	
Luxor University	LU	2019	
Mansoura University	MANS	1972	
Military Technical College	MTC	1957	
Minia University	-	1976	
Menoufia University	-	1976	
New Valley University	NVU	2018	
Port Said University	PSU	2010	
Sadat Academy for Management Sciences	SAMS	1981	
Sohag University	SO	2006	
South Valley University	SVU	1958	
Suez Canal University	SCU	1964	
Suez University	SU	2012	
Tanta University	TU	1972	
University of Sadat City	USC	2013	
Zagazig University	ZU	1974	

== National universities ==
University	Common abbreviation	Year established	Source
Ain Shams National University	-	2025	
Alexandria National University	ANU	2021	
Assiut National University	ASNU	2022	
Benha Naitional University	BNU	2022	
Beni Suef National University	BSNU	2022	
Cairo National University	CNU	2025	
Damanhour National University	DNU	2025	
Damietta National University	DAMNU	2025	
East Port Said National University	EPNU	2021	
Fayoum National University	FNU	2025	
Helwan National University	HNU	2022	
Kafrelsheikh National University	KNU	2025	
Luxor National University	LNU	2025	
Mansoura National University	MANSNU	2022	
Menoufia National University	MNU	2022	
Minya National University	MNU	2021	
National University of Sadat City	NUSC	2025	
New Valley National University	NVNU	2025	
New Ismailia National University	NINU	2025	
Sohag National University	SNU	2021	
South Valley National University	SVNU	2021	
Suez National University	-	2025	
Tanta National University	TNU	2025	
Zagazig National University	ZNU	2021	
Alamein International University	AIU	2020	
Egypt-Japan University of Science and Technology	E-JUST	2010	
Egypt University Of Informatics	EUI	2021	
Galala University	GU	2020	
King Salman International University	KSIU	2020	
New Mansoura University	NMU	2021	
Nile University	NU	2006	
The Egyptian E-learning University	EELU	2008	
Zewail City of Science, Technology and Innovation	ZC	2011	

== Private universities ==
University	Common abbreviation	Year established	Source
Ahram Canadian University	ACU	2005	
Al Hayah University in Cairo	AHUC	2019	
Al Ryada University for Science and Technology	RST	2021	
Al Salam University in Egypt	SUE	2018	
Arab Academy for Science, Technology and Maritime Transport	AASTMT	1972	
Arab Open University	AOU	2002	
Badr University in Cairo	BUC	2014	
Badr University in Assiut	BUA	2021	
Badya University	-	2023	
British University in Egypt	BUE	2005	
Canadian International College	CIC	2004	
City University of Cairo	CUC	2020	
Delta University for Science and Technology	DUST	2006	
Deraya University in Minya	-	2010	
Ecole Supérieure Libre des Sciences Commerciales Appliquées	ESLSCA	1997	
Egyptian Chinese University	ECU	2016	
Egyptian e-Learning University	EELU	2008	
Egyptian Russian University	ERU	2006	
El Saleheya El Gadida University	SGU	2020	
El Sewedy University of Technology	SUT	2023	
El Shorouk Academy	SHA	1995	
European Universities in Egypt (University of London (incl. LSE), University of Central Lancashire, University of East London)	EUE	2021 (2021, 2021, 2024)	
French University of Egypt	UFE	2002	
Future University in Egypt	FUE	2006	
German International University	GIU	2018	
German University in Cairo	GUC	2003	
Heliopolis University	HU	2012	
Hertfordshire University In Egypt	UH	2019	
Horus University	HUE	2019	
Innovation University	IU	2021	
Lotus University in Minya	LUM	2019	
May University in Cairo	MUC	2019	
Memphis University	-	2025	
Merit University	MUE	2019	
Misr International University	MIU	1996	
Misr University for Science and Technology	MUST	1996	
Modern Sciences and Arts University	MSA	1996	
Modern University for Technology and Information	MTI	2004	
Nahda University	NUB	2006	
Newgiza University	NGU	2016	
Nile Valley University	NVU	2021	
October 6 University	O6U	1996	
Pharos University in Alexandria	PUA	2007	
Rashid University	RU	2019	
Saxony Egypt University	SEU	2024	
Sinai University	SU	2006	
Sphinx University	-	2019	
The American University in Cairo	AUC	1919	
Toronto Metropolitan University Cairo	TMU	2022	
University of Prince Edward Island	UPEI	2018	

== See also ==
- Education in Egypt
- List of medical schools in Egypt
- Higher education in the Arab world
