= Bachelor of Medical Sciences =

Academic degree

A Bachelor of Medical Sciences (BMedSci, BMedSc, BSc(Med), BMSc) is an undergraduate academic degree involving study of a variety of disciplines related to human health leading to an in depth understanding of human biology and associated research skills such as study design, statistics and laboratory techniques. Such disciplines include biochemistry, cell biology, physiology, pharmacology or psychosocial aspects of health. It is an equivalent level qualification to the more commonly awarded Bachelor of Science (BSc). Graduates may enter a diverse range of roles including post-graduate study, higher education, the biotechnology industry, the pharmaceutical industry, consultancy roles, scientific communication, education or unrelated disciplines which make use of the broad range of transferable skills gained through this degree.

== Australia ==
In Australia, the Bachelor of Medical Sciences (BMedSc) degree is offered by The University of Adelaide, Griffith University, University of New South Wales, University of Sydney, Monash University, Australian National University, University of Western Sydney, University of Newcastle, Flinders University, Charles Sturt University, Macquarie University , Central Queensland University and The University of the Sunshine Coast.

== Canada ==
At the University of Western Ontario, BMSc is a four-year degree offered by the Schulich School of Medicine & Dentistry. It is differentiated from a BSc due to the advanced medical sciences orientation of the courses offered such as Anatomy and Pharmacology.

The University of Alberta offers a BMSc to Faculty of Medicine and Dentistry students who did not complete a bachelor's degree prior to entry into the program.

== India ==
In India, BMSc is an undergraduate degree offered by universities like Panjab University, Punjabi University, Indian Institutes of Technology and the R. G. Kar Medical College and Hospital.

== United Kingdom ==
In the United Kingdom, the Bachelor of Medical Sciences degree can be awarded in four situations; firstly as a standalone 3-year first degree, secondly, as a consequence of taking an extra year during a medical or dental course (termed intercalating), thirdly as an additional part of a medical degree but without any additional years of study, and fourthly as an exit award if a student wishes to leave their primary medical or dental undergraduate course. When the degree is obtained without any additional years of study, it may not be viewed as an equivalent qualification. For example, the UK Foundation Programme Office (the British body which manages first jobs for new medical graduates) places less value on a BMedSc degree if an additional year of study has not been undertaken. Regardless of the way in which the degree is obtained, a research project typically forms a large component of the degree as well as formal teaching in medical science related disciplines.

Bachelor of Medical Sciences degrees are awarded as a standalone 3-year course by the University of Chester, University of Exeter, University of Birmingham, the University of Sheffield, Bangor University, Oxford Brookes University, De Montfort University, and the University of St Andrews. Medical schools which award an intercalated Bachelor of Medical Sciences after an additional year of study are Barts and The London School of Medicine and Dentistry, the University of Birmingham, the University of Dundee, the University of Edinburgh the University of Aberdeen and the University of Sheffield. The University of Nottingham and the University of Southampton award the degree as a standard part of their undergraduate medicine courses without an additional year of study (students must undertake a research project).

== Egypt ==
In Egypt, the bachelor of medical sciences is awarded after four years of study in addition to an internship year in which interns are trained in multiple public and university hospitals.

The degree is offered in five universities in Egypt: October 6 University, Misr University for Science and Technology, Pharos University in Alexandria, Beni-Suef University and Menoufia University. Faculties of applied medical sciences offer various disciplines for students to choose from, including medical laboratories, radiology and medical imaging, therapeutic nutrition, and biomedical equipment.

In 2015, the Central Authority For Organization and Administration (CAOA) granted the holders of the bachelor of medical sciences the title of "specialist" in the corresponding specialty.

== Israel ==
BSc.Med is granted by all six medical schools in Israel: the Hebrew University, Tel Aviv University, Ben-Gurion University, the Technion, Bar-Ilan University and Ariel University. The full M.D. program consists of six years of studies and an additional year of internship. The first part of the program consists of three years of basic science (pre-clinical) studies, culminating in the award of a BSc.Med degree in medical sciences.
