= Badredin Aboughazi =

Egyptian politician

- Born: May 14, 1920
- Died: September 11, 1983 (aged 63)
- Occupation: writer Egyptian Minister of Culture
- Family: His son Imad Aboughazi held the position of Minister of Culture
- Awards: Egypt France Prize for his book Mukhtar and the Renaissance of Egypt (1960); Art Criticism Award from the Ministry of Culture (1977); State Appreciation Award (1978); Award of the Republic, First Class (1979)

Badredin Mahmoud Aboughazi (Arabic: بدرالدين محمود أبوغازي; May 14, 1920 – September 11, 1983) was the Egyptian Minister of Culture from November 1970 to May 1971. He supervised the issuance of the Comprehensive Social Survey of the Society (1952–1980), this was called the "Second Description of Egypt", and that was the last important work that was done by him.

== Career ==
Aboughazi obtained a Bachelor of Laws from Cairo University in 1941.in the same year, he worked in the Tax Authority until 1955. Next, he was transferred as Director of the Technical Office for Tax Affairs at the Ministry of Finance. After that, he became the Director of the Office of the Minister of Finance. Then, he acted as the Director of the Financial Legislation Department at the Ministry of Treasury in 1961. Later, he served as Treasury Under Secretary for Financial and Tax Legislation from 1964 to 1970. Also in November 1970, he was appointed as a Minister of Culture, and remained in this position until May 1971. Then he worked between 1973 and 1977 as an advisor to the Arab Organization for Education, Science and Culture. Meanwhile, he edited the "Arab Culture Magazine", which was issued by the organization. In 1977, he worked as Assistant Secretary-General for the Council of Arab Economic Unity, then Acting Secretary-General between 1979 and 1981.

== Memberships in Political, Cultural and Artistic Bodies and Councils ==
He was a member of many councils: a member of the Supreme Council of Culture, a member of the Plastic Arts Committee of the Supreme Council for the Sponsorship of Arts, Literature and Social Sciences, a member of the Arabic Language Academy in Cairo, a member of the Subcommittee for Advocacy and Thought Affairs of the Socialist Union in 1972, a member of the National Council for Culture, a member of the Egyptian National Division at the National Theater Center. Since the early seventies, he has led the board of directors of the Art Lovers Association, the board of directors of the Fine Arts Syndicate in Egypt in 1977. He was Vice Chairman of the Board of Directors of the Scientific Society of Antiquities between 1978 and 1983. He was a member of the Board of Directors of the Egyptian Society for Historical Studies from 1979 until his death. He was rapporteur of the Arts Division of the Supreme Council of the Press in 1983. He was also a member of the Egyptian Association for Political Economy, Legislation and Statistics.

=== In the Arab society ===
He began his work as Minister of Culture by visiting the Arabic Language Academy, and the complex had not had a fixed headquarters since its establishment, so Aboughazi decided to give the academy its current headquarters in House No. 15 of the former Swiss Institute Street (now Aziz Abaza Street). It was the seat of a large section of the Ministry of Culture, and the complex granted its membership to Aboughazi in 1974 and became involved in the work of the History Committee, the Economic Committee, and the Civilization Words Committee.

== Works ==
- "Mokhtar: His Life and Art" (Cairo, May 1949).
- "Mokhtar and the Renaissance of Egypt" (in French with Gabriel Qatar, Paris, October 1949): The book won the Egypt-France Prize in 1950.
- "Five contemporary artists".
- "From the environment of the arts" (studies on the arts of the sixth, seventeenth and eighteenth centuries, and the arts of Egypt in the first half of the twentieth century).
- "The Millennium of Cairo" (a study on the history of plastic arts in Cairo during a thousand years).
- "Mahmoud Said" (1960).
- Mukhtar's as an example" (1964): also published in English, commissioned by UNESCO.
- "Art in Our World" (Dar Al-Maaref, Cairo, 1973).
- "Generation of Pioneers" (1975): About the pioneers of contemporary Egyptian art in painting and sculpture.
- "Youssef Kamel" (1978).
- "Ramses Younan: Artist and Critic" (1980).
- "Ragheb Ayyad" (1984).
- "Seasons in Fine Arts" (1985, published posthumously).
- "Arts and Literature" (Social Survey 1952–1980).

== His work at the Universities ==
He taught at Helwan University and was selected as a member of its board of directors, and a member of the Faculty of Arts Council at Minya University, and he taught in the faculties of media and law at Cairo University.

== Comprehensive Social Survey of the Community ==
The Comprehensive Social Survey of Society "1952–1980" – which some called the "second description of Egypt" – was the last important work in which Abu Ghazi participated. This great work was undertaken by the "National Center for Social and Criminological Research" under the supervision of Dr. Muhammad Sobhi Abdel Hakim and then Dr. Ahmed Khalifa.

He was chosen to head the specialized committees that prepared these studies, each in his specialization. Badredin Aboughazi, the former Minister of Culture, was chosen as the head of the Arts and Literature Committee. Ahmed Hamdi Mahmoud, Samir Farid, Dr. Saad Al-Bahrawi, Dr. Sabri Hafez, Dr. Diaa Abu Ghazi, Ali Abu Shadi, Faraj Al-Antari, Fouad Dawara, and Lami Al-Mutai’i were with Aboughazi at the committee.

This survey covered fourteen topics:

1. Arts and Literature
2. Media
3. Justice
4. Security
5. Health
6. Education
7. Services
8. Housing
9. Transportation
10. Economic Construction
11. Political Construction
12. Social Gradient
13. Family
14. Population

Each of the studies related to each axis was issued in a separate book, and in addition to these specialized books, a volume was issued containing summaries of these studies as general indicators of these different themes.

== Family ==
His uncle was Mahmoud Mokhtar, whom Aboughazi published a book about in French in 1949 entitled "Mukhtar and the Renaissance of Egypt", for which he won the "Egypt France" award. He also published a book about him in 1964.

His son Imad Aboughazi, who was born in 1955, held the position of Minister of Culture in the Ministry of Dr. Essam Sharaf.

== Awards ==
- Egypt France Prize for his book "Mukhtar and the Renaissance of Egypt" (1960).
- Art Criticism Award from the Ministry of Culture (1977).
- State Appreciation Award (1978).
- Award of the Republic, First Class (1979).

In recognition of his role in the field of plastic arts, Akhenaton Hall was named after his death.

== Death ==
Badredin Aboughazi died on September 11, 1983, while being treated in Boston, USA, at the age of 63.
