= Sinai University =

University in Sinai, Egypt

Coordinates: 31°6′50″N 33°41′25″E

- جامعة سينـاء
- Motto: We Know Your Story.
- Type: Private University
- Established: 2006
- President: Prof. Dr. Gehan Fekry Mohamed Abdellatif
- Location: Main Campus: Arish, North Sinai and Second Campus: El Qantara, Ismailia, Egypt
- Website: www.su.edu.eg

Sinai University (Arabic: جامعة سيناء) is a private university in Sinai, Egypt. It was established in 2006. Its president is Professor Gehan Fekry Mohamed Abdellatif and the chairman of its board of trustees is the Egyptian businessman Hassan Rateb.

It is one of two universities located in northern Sinai, along with Arish University.

== Faculties ==
It comprises 4 faculties in the Arish campus, which are:

- Faculty of Pharmacy and Pharmaceutical Industries.
- Faculty of Dentistry.
- Faculty of Engineering.
- Faculty of Information Technology and Computer Science.

It also has 7 faculties in Qantara campus:

- Faculty of Pharmacy and Pharmaceutical Industries .
- Faculty of Dentistry.
- Faculty of Engineering (Architecture branch only).
- Faculty of Information Technology and Computer Science.
- Faculty of Business Administration.
- Faculty of Mass Communication (English and Arabic).
- Faculty of Physical Therapy.

== See also ==
- List of universities in Egypt
- List of medical schools in Egypt
