= Faculty of Electronic Engineering, Menoufia University =

University in Menoufia Governorate, Egypt

Coordinates: 30°33′56″N 31°00′46″E

Faculty of Electronic Engineering
- Type: Public
- Established: 1964
- President: Prof. Abd El-Naser Abd El-Gawad Mohamed
- Dean: Prof. Abd El-Naser Abd El-Gawad Mohamed
- Location: Menoufia, Egypt
- Campus: Menouf, Menoufia
- Website: www.menofia.edu.eg/FEE/Home/en

The Faculty of Electronic Engineering is a faculty of Menoufia University. It was formally designated and established in the city of Menouf as the Higher Institute of Electronics under supervision of the Ministry of Higher Education, in 1964. Menouf city lies to the south west of delta at about 65 km north of Cairo.

== History ==
In 1975, the institute was merged with Tanta University under the name of the Faculty of Electronic Engineering. The decision was taken to establish a specialized faculty that awards B.Sc. degree in engineering in the field of electronics. In 1976, the Faculty of Electronic Engineering became a member of the Minufiya University that was established at that time. Until now, the Faculty of Electronic Engineering is the only specialized Faculty in this field in Egypt. Other universities may include only departments of Electrical and Electronic Engineering.

== Degrees offered ==
The Faculty of Electronic Engineering awards the following grades:

-B.Sc. degree in Electronic Engineering in the following specialization:

- Industrial Electronics and Automatic Control Engineering.
- Electronics and communication Engineering.
- Computer Science and Engineering.

-Diploma in Engineering Science.

-M.Sc. degree in Engineering Science.

-Ph.D. degree in Engineering Science.

The B.Sc. degree is awarded after the student successfully completing a full-time study of five academic years (preparatory Year + 4 years). After the student successfully completes the second year, he/she has to be directed to one of the faculty departments to enhance his/her knowledge in a certain specialization of the faculty.

== Department of Industrial Electronics and Automatic Control Engineering ==
Students enter this department in the third and fourth year of their study in the college.

No of students : roughly 200 student.

== Department of Electronics and communication Engineering ==
Students enter this department in the third and fourth year of their study in the college.

No of students : roughly 170 student.

== Department of Computer Science and Engineering ==
Students enter this department in the third and fourth year of their study in the college.

No of students : roughly 180 student.

== Department of Mathematics and Physics ==
Students Study subjects by this department's teaching staff during the first three years of their study in the college.

No of students : roughly 550 student (all students entering the college).

== See also ==
- List of Engineering Faculties in Egypt
