= Egyptian e-Learning University =

National university in Cairo, Egypt

Coordinates: 30.0378°N 31.2168°E

The Egyptian E-Learning University
- الجامعة المصرية للتعلم الإلكترونى الأهلية
- Type: National non-profit
- Established: August 2008
- Students: 1250 every new year
- Location: Cairo, Egypt
- Campus: Cairo, Tanta, Assuit
- Website: https://www.eelu.edu.eg/

National Egyptian E-Learning University (EELU) (Arabic: الجامعة المصرية للتعلم الإلكترونى الأهلية) is a non-profit Egyptian National University, and the first Egyptian university to offer E-Learning services. EELU was established through Decree No. 233 by the President of the Arab Republic of Egypt on August 16, 2008 to provide distance education through 24-hour online learning. As at 2024, the director of the University is Dr. Ahmed Abu Al-Magd and the director of student affairs is Khaled Hashem. In August 2023, the university was shortlisted as the 'Student Recruitment Campaign of the Year' by the Times Higher Education Awards MENA.

== See also ==
- Education in Egypt
- List of universities in Egypt
