= Damanhour University =

Public university in Damanhour, Egypt

Coordinates: 31°02′14″N 30°27′34″E

- Type: Public
- Established: 2010
- President: Ebeed Abd Elatty Saleh
- Location: Damanhour, Egypt
- Campus: Damanhour
- Website: damanhour.edu.eg/pages/default.aspx

Damanhour University is located in Damanhour, Beheira Governorate, Egypt. Originally a satellite campus of Alexandria University, it was granted independent university status in 2010.

== See also ==
- Education in Egypt
- List of universities in Egypt
