= Al Galala =

Planned city in Suez, Egypt

Al Galala City
- city
- Location in Egypt
- Coordinates: 29.4300567°N 32.3973211°E
- Country: Egypt
- Governorate: Suez
- Established: 2021
- Time zone: UTC+2 (EET)
  - Summer (DST): UTC+3 (EEST)

Al Galala City (Arabic: مدينة الجلالة, [el ɡæˈlæːlæ], "sublimity city") is a planned city in northeast Egypt. It lies on Northern Galala Plateau on the western side of the Gulf of Suez. The city represents one of several ambitious urban development projects of the government.

The city will include luxury and medium and middle income housing, touristic resorts, hotels, a water park, and a phosphate fertilizers factory. In September 2020, Galala University accepted its first students, being one of the first universities in Egypt to follow the Ahleya model. The city will also include Egypt's first Olympic village. Construction of the city started in 2015 and will be implemented in three phases. In 2017, the 82 kilometer-long Al Galala road was opened, starting in Ain Sokhna road, and ending near Zaafarana, connecting the city to the capital and to other cities on the Red Sea coast.
