= Ayman Al-Hendy =

Egyptian professor (born 1964)

- Born: Ayman Al-Hendy; 24 January 1964 (age 62); Benha, Egypt
- Education: Zagazig University; University of Turku
- Scientific career
- Workplaces: University of Chicago; University of Illinois Chicago; Augusta University; Meharry Medical College

Ayman Al-Hendy (born 24 January 1964) is a professor and director of translational research from Department of Obstetrics and Gynecology at the University of Chicago. His branch of medical/surgical knowledge is obstetrics and gynecology, particularly in the spheres of “gene/stem cell therapy”, “reproductive genetics”, and “stem cell biology”.

== Early life and career ==
From 2014 to 2018, he served as a professor and Director for Division of Interdisciplinary Translational Research, Department of Obstetrics and Gynecology, Medical College of Georgia, Augusta University (formerly Georgia Regents University). During 2007–2014, he was Scientific Director, Center for Women Health Research, Gynecologist/Obstetrician, professor and Vice Chair, Meharry Medical College, Nashville, Tennessee. Al-Hendy published about 191 original peer-reviewed articles, 24 books/chapters/reviews/case reports, and 239 abstracts presented at scientific conferences.

Al-Hendy’s research has been continuously funded by the National institute of health (NIH, USA) since 2003. He served as chair of the Integrative Clinical Endocrinology and Reproduction (ICER) 2012-2015. In 2025,Al-Hendy served as president of the Society for Reproductive Investigation (SRI).

== Education background ==
He received his M.D from Benha Faculty of Medicine Zagazig University, Benha, Egypt in 1987, and soon after completion of his M.D, he started practicing as an intern at Benha University Hospital Benha, Egypt in 1988. He received his Ph.D. (DNA – laboratory) from University of Turku, Finland in 1992; and was a postdoctoral research fellow in human genetics at McMaster University in 1994.

== Specialty areas ==
Rejuvenation of Premature Ovarian Failure with Stem Cells (ROSE) is Al-Hendy’s ongoing project.

Ayman then corroborated studies to improve the health/medical care of women, and remove health discrepancy. He directed his attention to Uterine Fibroids Treatment and Research Center.

== Honors and awards ==
- 2018 Pfizer-SRI President’s Presenter’s Award
- 2018 Star Award, American Society of Reproductive Medicine (ASRM)
- Best Poster Prize Award, Society of Reproductive Investigations (SRI)
- President Achievement Award–2015
- IRA and ESTER ROSENWAKS New Investigator Award
- Young Investigator Award, San Diego, California 1990
