= Sadat Academy for Management Sciences =

Egyptian public academy for management sciences

Coordinates: 29°57′06″N 31°14′57″E

- Type: Public
- Established: 1981
- President: Inas Ezz (2020)
- Location: Cairo, Egypt
- Campus: Maadi, Cairo
- Website: www.sadatacademy.edu.eg

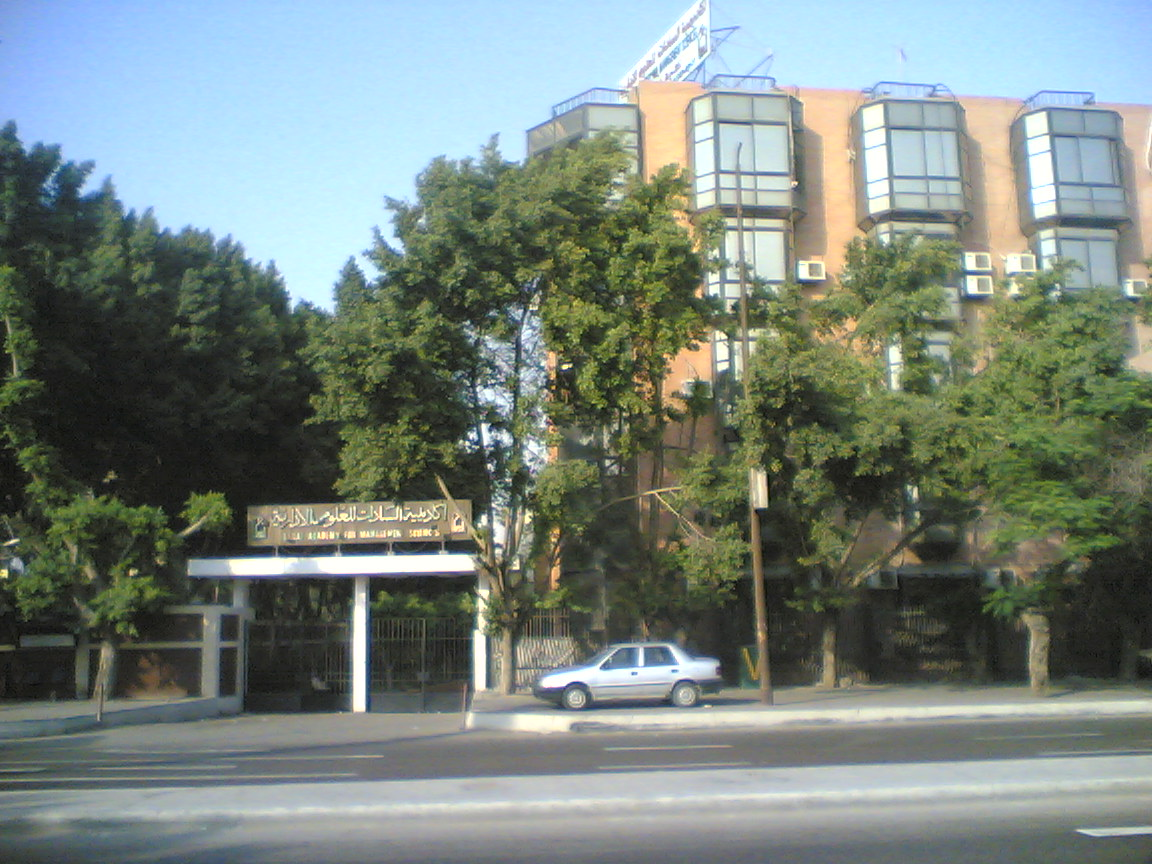
sadat academy

Sadat Academy for Management Sciences (SAMS) (Arabic:أكاديمية السادات للعلوم الإدارية ʼAkādemyāt ʼal-sādāt lil-ʿoloom al ʼedāriāh) is an Egyptian Public Academy under the authorization of the Ministry of State for Administrative Development (SAMS) founded in Egypt in 1981. Its headquarters in Maadi (Corniche el Nile), including The Faculty of Management Sciences (FMS), and The Research and Information Center (RIC), SAMS branch in Ramsis street in Cairo, has the Training Center and Managerial Consultation Center.

== Agreements between SAMS and Foreign and Local Organizations ==
1. Agreement with Ministry of Telecommunications and Information Technology, 2005
2. Agreement with Development Social Fund, 2005.
3. Agreement with Self-Development Institution, Saudi Arabia
4. Agreement with University of Potsdam, Germany, first concluded in 1999 and renewed in 2006
5. Protocol of Cooperation with Sales Taxation Authority in the fields of training, graduate studies, publications and others
6. Agreement with Fulbright on educational and cultural exchange between USA and Egypt, 1998

== Educational Programs ==
=== Under Graduate Program ===
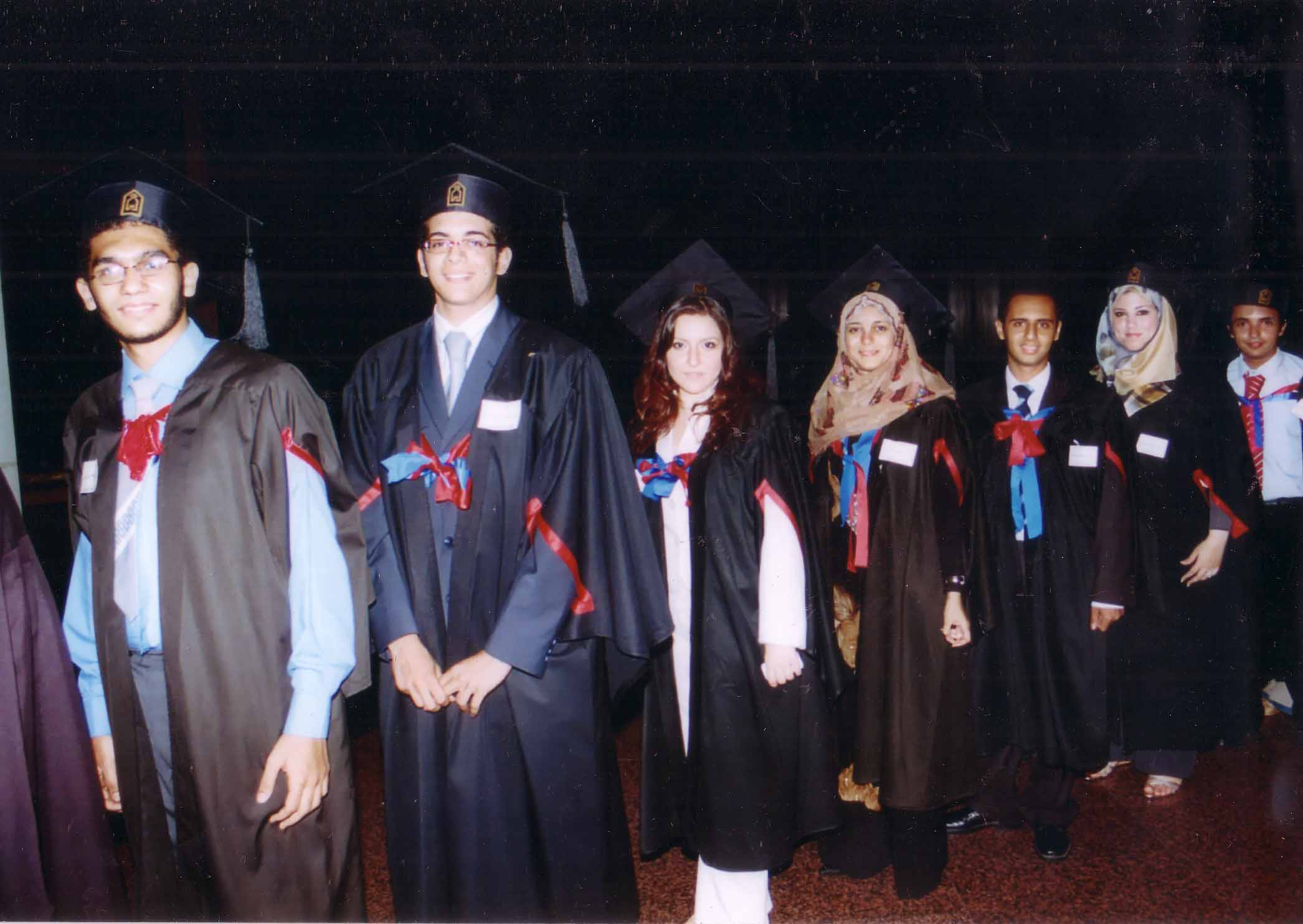
Graduation no.23 in 2007

SAMS undergraduate program is mainly located in Cairo, Maadi. It is also offered in two of SAMS premises situated in the cities of Port Said, and Dekernes (Delta). It awards bachelor's degree in Management Sciences, accredited by the Supreme Council of Universities Decrees No. 3 of 1986 and No. 110 of 2006.

The following new specializations have been recently introduced:

- Finance
- Investment
- Marketing
- Human Resources
- E-Commerce
- Banking
- Management of Information System (MIS)
- Petroleum & Energy Corporations Management
- Tourism and Hotels Management
- Economics
- Accounting

== Academic departments ==
- Business Administration Department
- Computers and Information Systems Department
- Production and Operation Management Department
- Personnel Administration and Behavioral Sciences Department
- Managerial Law Department
- Public and Local Administration Department
- Economics Department
- Accounting Department
- Languages Department

== Academy Branches ==
- Ramsis
- Port Said
- Dekernes
- Tanta
- Alexandria
- Asiut
- Maadi

== See also ==
- Education in Egypt
- List of universities in Egypt
