= Canadian International College =

College in Cairo, Egypt

- المعهد الكندي العالي
- Type: University - College
- Active: May 2004–still open
- Academic affiliations: Cape Breton University
- Students: 9000
- Undergraduates: 5000+
- Location: New Cairo, Cairo, Egypt; 30.0347°N 31.4295°E
- Campus: [uburban
- Website: www.cic-cairo.edu.eg

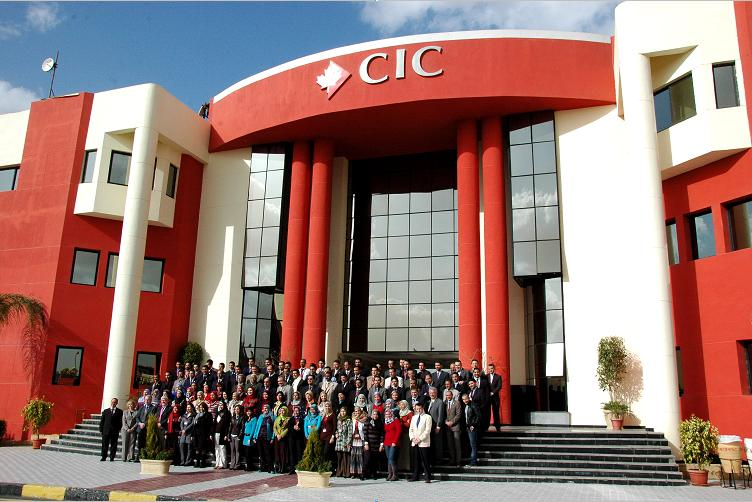
CIC Front Campus with Employees

The Canadian International College (CIC) (Arabic: المعهد الكندي العالي, transliteration: Al Ma'haad Al Canadie Alaaly), is an Egyptian University in Cairo, Egypt. The CIC is the sole provider of Canadian higher education in Egypt. CIC is the Cairo campus for Cape Breton University. It has two campuses, the main campus is located in the residential area of El Tagamoa El Khames in New Cairo city and the other campus is located in El Sheikh Zayed.

The university offers two types of programs, an Egyptian program in which Students gain the Egyptian bachelor's degree accredited from both the Supreme Council of Universities and the Ministry of Higher Education, and the Dual program where students earn both the Egyptian bachelor's degree accredited from the Supreme Council of Universities and the Ministry of Higher Education, and the Canadian bachelor's degree from Cape Breton University according to the Field of Study.

Canadian International College offers its students the opportunity to travel and study in Canada for one semester, one full year through its Exchange programs with Cape Breton University in Nova Scotia, Canada or to transfer and continue their studies completely through the Transfer program.

== See also ==
- List of Egyptian universities
- American University in Cairo
- British University in Egypt
- Université Française d'Égypte
