= Alamein International University =

National university at New Alamein City, Egypt

Alamein International University (AIU)
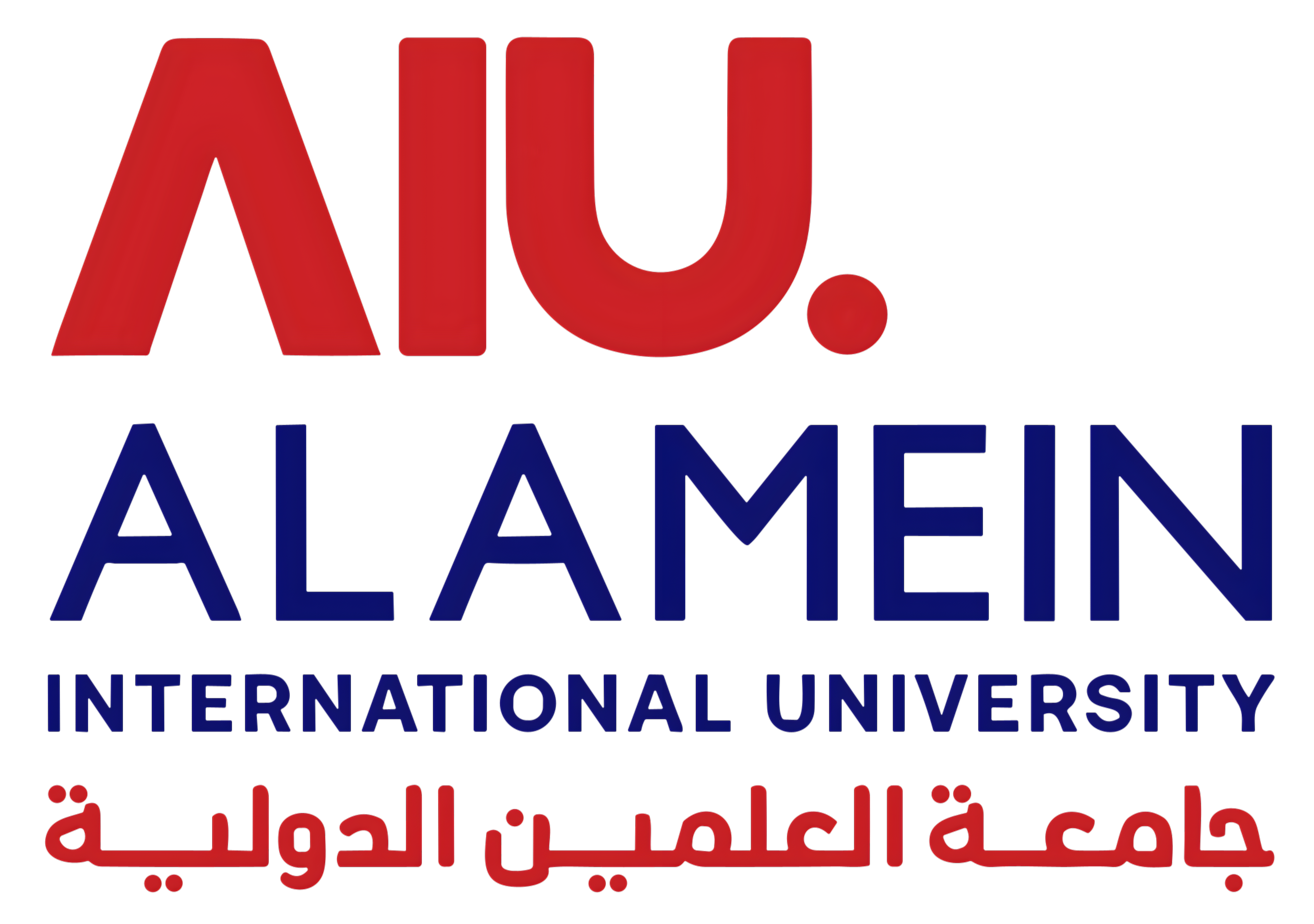
- Type: National
- Established: 2020
- President: Prof. Dr. Essam Elkordi
- Location: New Alamein, Egypt
- Website: aiu.edu.eg

Alamein International University (AIU) is an Egyptian national, non-profit university which was inaugurated in 2020 in accordance with a presidential decree Number 435 of 2020. The university is located in New Alamein City, Matrouh Governorate in Egypt.

== Campus ==
Alamein International University - AIU is built on approximately 150 acres and includes a central library, Outdoor theater, sports & entertainment area, university hospital, dentistry hospital, university administration building, 10 buildings for faculties, 4 Accommodation towers for students and Staff, as well as extra 9 residential buildings outside the university campus in Eleskan Elmotamyez district.

== Faculties and academic programs ==
Alamein International University (AIU) offers more than 44 Programs in 13 Different Fields:

- Faculty of Business (started in October 2020)
- Faculty of Arts and Design (started in October 2020)
- Faculty of Engineering (started in October 2020)
- Faculty of Computer Science and Engineering (started in October 2020)
- Faculty of Pharmacy (started in October 2020)
- Faculty of Advanced Basic Science (started in October 2022)
- Faculty of Dental Medicine (started in October 2021)
- Faculty of Physical Therapy (started in October 2024)

== Facilities ==
- Dorms
- Transportation
- Free Wi-Fi
- Activities center
- Medical clinic
- Indoor sports hall
- Outdoor theatre
- Central library
- Free access to Oracle SIS, Canvas LMS, EKB, Office 365

== See also ==
- Education in Egypt
- List of universities in Egypt
