= Alexandria National University =

Egyptian national university

Coordinates: 31.2140°N 29.9761°E

- Type: National university
- Established: 2021; 5 years ago
- President: Abdelaziz Konsowa
- Students: 5898
- Location: Alexandria, Egypt
- Number Of Faculties: 14
- Website: anu.edu.eg

Alexandria National University is an Egyptian national university, considered part of Alexandria University, It was established by decree of the President of the Arab Republic of Egypt No. 425 dated ٍ 5 September 2022. It is located in the new Smouha area on an area of 30 acres.

A committee was formed to conduct the necessary studies for the university, determine its faculties, scientific departments, and regulatory bylaws. The university includes 14 faculties in various disciplines. Construction work for the university began in November 2021, and studies commenced in six faculties in September 2022.

== Faculties ==
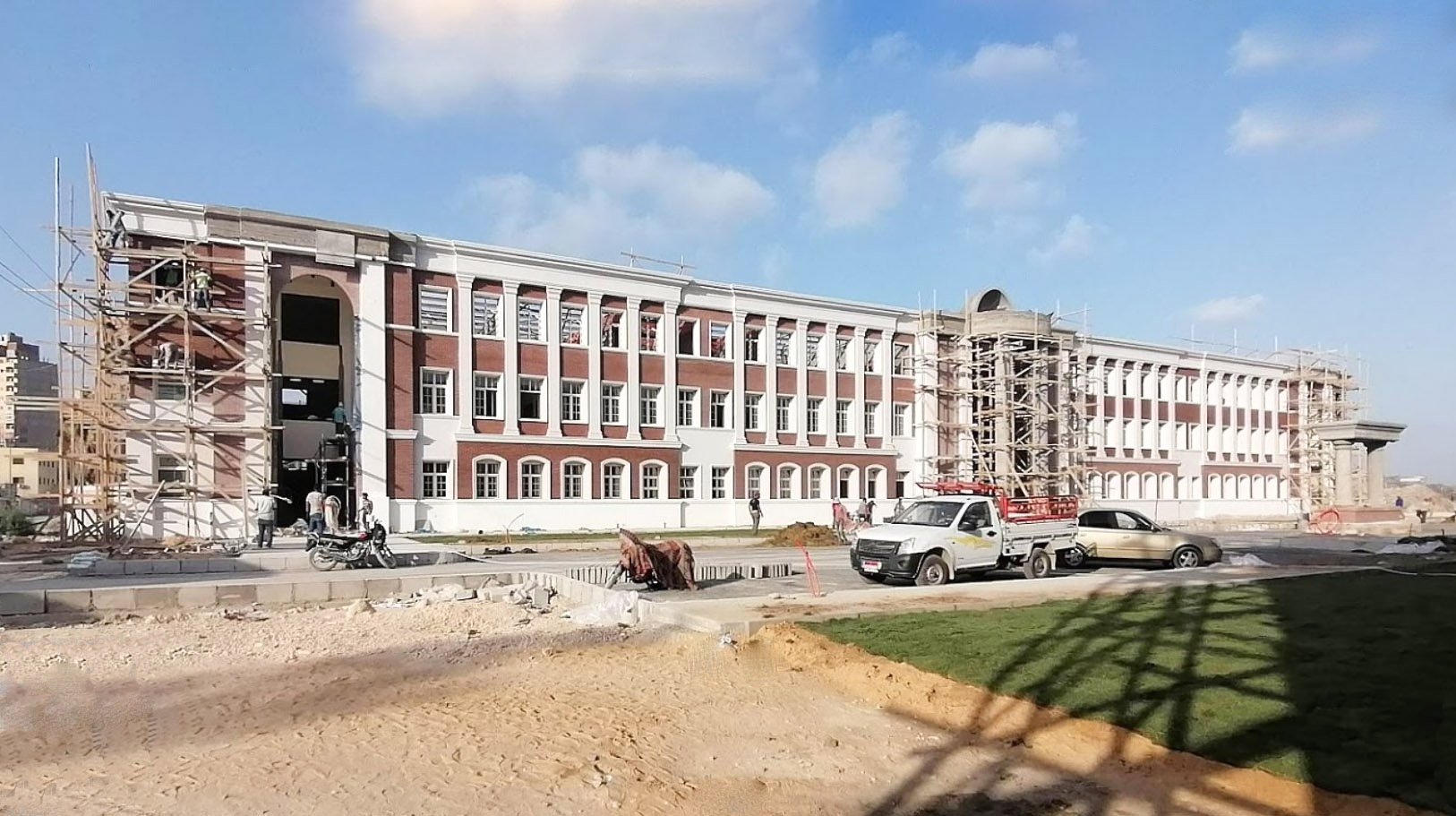
New campus expansions under construction

The university comprises 7 faculties:

- Faculty of Medicine.
- Faculty of Dentistry.
- Faculty of Pharmacy.
- Faculty of Engineering.
- Faculty of Social and Human Sciences.
- Faculty of Economics and Management Technology Sciences.
- Faculty of Computer Science.

== See also ==
- Pharos University in Alexandria
- List of universities in Egypt
