= Port Said University =

Public university in Port Said, Egypt

- جامعة بورسعيد
- Former name: Suez Canal University Port Said Branch (1976–2010)
- Type: Public university
- Established: 2010
- President: Prof. Dr. Sherif Youssef Saleh
- Location: Port Said, Egypt; 31°14′29″N 32°19′00″E
- Campus: Urban
- Colours: Dark blue & white
- Website: psu.edu.eg

Port Said University (Arabic: جامعة بورسعيد) is a university in Port Said, Egypt. It was established in 2010, after the Presidential decision to establish the university to transfer Suez Canal branch in Port Said to an independent university. The history of the university extends before its establishment; as the existence of its first faculties was the faculty of engineering in 1975 under the supervision of Helwan University, then under the supervision of Suez Canal University when it was established in 1976.

More faculties were established in Port Said Governorate increasing to four faculties prompting the decision of establishing Port Said University as a branch of the Suez Canal University in 1998. The decision of the Republic President, for establishing Port Said University in 2010, was the result of the continuous increase of the faculties outreaching nine Educational institutions. Now, Port Said University consists of thirteen faculties including: faculty of Engineering; faculty of Medicine; faculty of Pharmacy; faculty of Science; faculty of Commerce; faculty of Education; faculty of Physical Education; faculty of Specific Education; faculty of nursing; Faculty of education for early childhood; faculty of Arts; faculty of Law and faculty of Management Technology And Information Systems.

== Faculties ==
At the time it became an independent institution in 2010, it had the following faculties:

- Faculty of Engineering
- Faculty of Commerce
- Faculty of Education
- Faculty of Physical Education
- Faculty of Specific Education
- Faculty of Nursing
- Faculty of Education For Early Childhood
- Faculty of Science
- Faculty of Arts
- Faculty of Management Technology and Information Systems
- Faculty of Medicine
- Faculty of Pharmacy
- Faculty of Law

== See also ==
- Educational institutions in Port Said
- Education in Egypt
- Egyptian universities
- List of Egyptian universities
