= University of Sadat City =

University in Sadat City, Egypt

Coordinates: 30°22′10″N 30°29′51″E

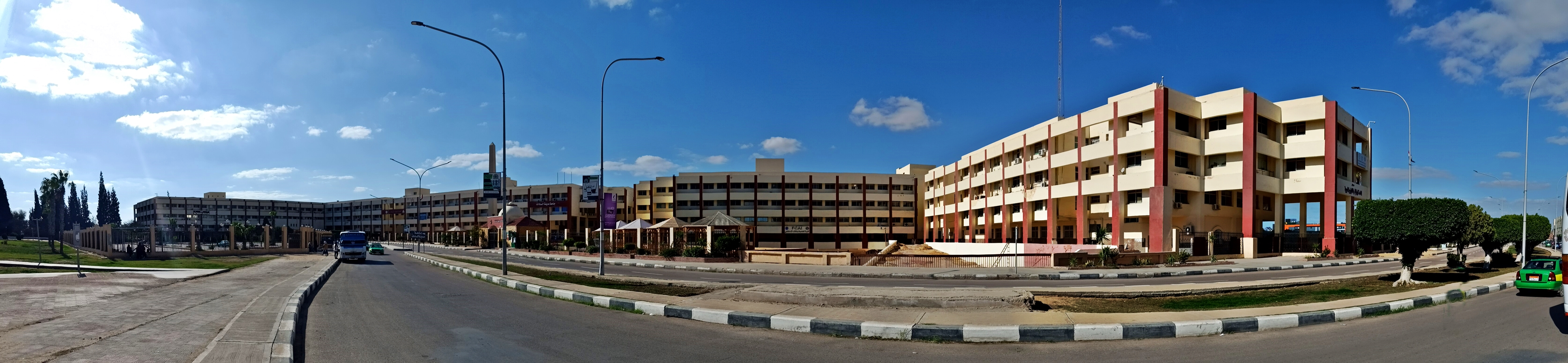
- Type: Public
- Established: 25 March 2013; 13 years ago
- President: Prof. Dr. Salah El-Ballal
- Administrative staff: 650
- Location: Sadat City, Egypt
- Campus: Sadat City
- Website: www.usc.edu.eg

University of Sadat City (Arabic: جامعة مدينة السادات) is an Egyptian Governmental University, initially established as a branch of Menofia University. It later became a self-governmental University, founded by the presidential decree no. 180/2013, on 13 March 2013, The USC campus is located in Sadat City, northwest of Cairo.

== Faculties and institutes ==
The USC campus currently comprises the following colleges and institutes:

- Faculty Of Physical Education
- Faculty of Tourism and Hotels
- Faculty Of Veterinary Medicine
- Faculty Of Pharmacy
- Faculty of Commerce
- Faculty of Education
- Faculty Of Law
- Genetic Engineering and Biotechnology Research Institute
- Institute of Environmental Studies and Research

Its campus is modern and provides academic and non-academic facilities and services, including a library and administrative services, to serve its 41,000 students.

As of 2023, its overall world ranking is 5678th, its rank in research is 6107th, and rank in innovation is 4083rd, and its societal ranking is 6031st.

== See also ==
- Education in Egypt
- List of universities in Egypt
