= Arish University =

Egyptian public university

- جامعة العريش
- Type: Public university
- Established: April 25, 2016
- Undergraduates: 12,000
- Postgraduates: 3,000
- Location: Arish, Egypt; 31.1351°N 33.8287°E
- Website: aru.edu.eg

Arish University (Arabic: جامعة العريش) is a public university in Arish, North Sinai Governorate, Egypt. It was established by presidential decree on April 25, 2016. The university was initially established as a branch of the Suez Canal University.

The university includes eleven colleges as well as a research institute for postgraduate studies. The college of medicine opened in 2021.

It is one of two universities in northern Sinai, along with Sinai University.
