= New Valley University =

University in the New Valley Governorate of Egypt

- Type: Public
- Established: 2019
- Location: New Valley Governorate, Egypt; 25°31′18″N 30°36′28″E
- Website: www.nv.aun.edu.eg

New Valley University is a university in New Valley Governorate, Egypt.

== Origin ==
On September 3, 2019, Prime Minister Mostafa Madbouly issued a decision to amend some provisions of the executive regulations of the Universities Regulation Law to establish New Valley University, in addition to the universities stipulated in Article (2) of the Universities Regulation Law. The Prime Minister's decision included the establishment of the New Valley University, based in the New Valley Governorate, provided that the branch of Assiut University in the New Valley is abolished, and its affiliated colleges are included in the New Valley University.

On January 31, 2020, the Ministry of Higher Education approved a project to establish a Faculty of Human Medicine at the University of the New Valley, where the building of the old governorate office in Jamal Abdel Nasser Street in Kharga City will be converted into a Faculty of Human Medicine at the University of the New Valley.

On October 6, 2020, the governor of Al-Wadi Al-Jadid inspected the constructions at the university's headquarters in the north of the city of Al-Kharga, where the works that are currently taking place include the construction of the Faculty of Science buildings at a total cost of 71 million pounds, and the building of the Faculty of Agriculture, which is located On an area of 5,800 square meters, it consists of 3 floors, at a cost of 91 million pounds, and the measurement and evaluation building, which is located on an area of 3,000 square meters, and consists of three floors and includes an auditorium with a capacity of 300 students, exam halls, an equipped conference hall, and administrative and service rooms.

On June 10, 2021, New Valley University received the Pharmaceutical Sciences Sector Committee of the Supreme Council of Universities, to inspect the building of the Faculty of Pharmacy to be established at New Valley University.

== Faculties ==
- Faculty of Education
- Faculty of Arts
- College of Agriculture
- College of Science
- Faculty of Physical Education
- College of Veterinary Medicine
- College of Human Medicine
- College of Nursing
- College of Mining Engineering
- College of Computers and Information
- Faculty of Pharmacy

== See also ==
- Education in Egypt
- List of universities in Egypt
