= Luxor University =

Egyptian public university

- Established: 2019
- Founders: Egyptian Government
- Location: Luxor, Egypt
- Website: http://www.luxor.edu.eg/

Luxor University (Arabic: جامعة الأقصر) is an Egyptian public university in Luxor Governorate, Upper Egypt. Formerly, it was a branch of South Valley University.

== Faculties ==
The university campus in the city of New Thebes and includes:

- Faculty of Science: This includes a multi-purpose sports field, several laboratories (including Chemistry, Geology, Physics, Botany, and Zoology), administrative offices, and classrooms.
- Faculty of Education: This includes a seminar hall, organic and inorganic chemistry laboratories, an auditorium, classrooms, administrative offices, and a multi-purpose sports field.
- Faculty of Medicine occupies 13,000 square meters and includes lecture halls and classrooms, as well as offices for the Dean, Vice Deans, faculty members and their assistants, administrative offices, laboratories for the Department of Human Anatomy, and laboratories for Physiology, Histology, Parasitology, Microbiology, Pathology, Pharmacology, Forensic Medicine, and Clinical Toxicology, a library, an electronic testing center, medical care and service buildings, a mosque, a cafeteria, green spaces, and a parking garage to support the educational process at the Faculty of Medicine.
- Luxor University Hospital is located on 5 acres with a capacity of 150 beds, it adheres to the quality control standards of the Comprehensive Health Insurance System and utilizes latest technological systems.
- Faculty of Computing and Information
- College of Fine Arts
- College of Al-Alsun
- Faculty of Archaeology
- Faculty of Tourism and Hotels
- College of Nursing

== See also ==
- Education in Egypt
- List of Universities in Egypt
