= Suez University =

Public university in Egypt

Coordinates: 29.9978°N 32.4984°E

- جامعة السويس
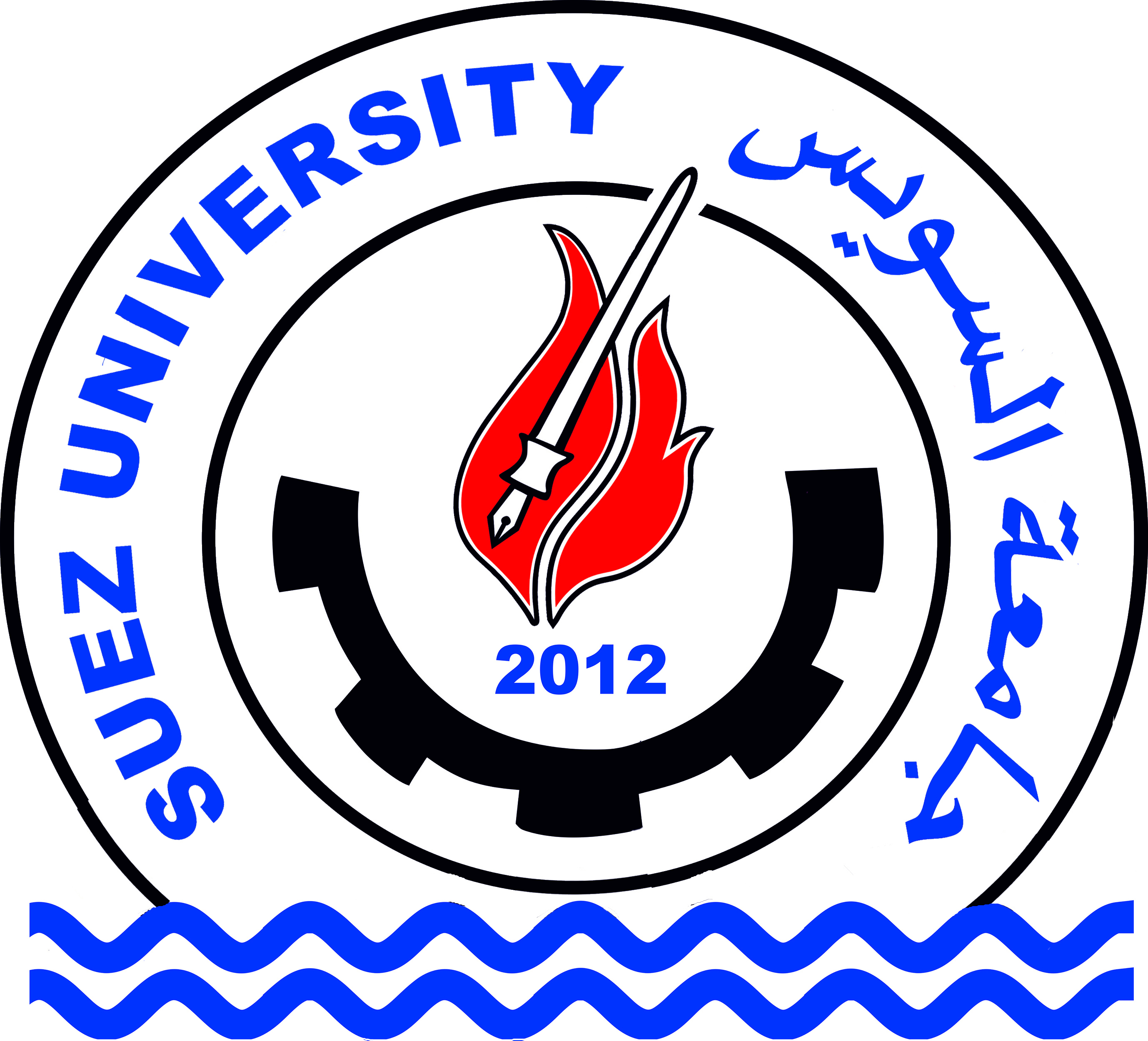
- Type: Public university
- Established: 2012
- President: Abdul Azim Al-Sharkawy
- Location: Suez, Egypt
- Website: suezuniv.edu.eg

Suez University is an Egyptian public university established by the presidential decree no 193 in 2012 to transfer Suez Canal University branch in Suez to an independent university. Suez University is the first university established by a presidential decree after the January 25 revolution in Egypt.

== Centers ==
- Center of Excellence for Energy and Water
- Public Service Center for Human Development and Performance Development
- Center for Scientific Consultation, Training and Environmental monitoring
- Center for Community Service and Environmental Development
- Public Service Center for Engineering and Environment
- Public Service Center for Technological Consultation, Research and Training
- Public Service Center for Trade and Economic Consultation

== See also ==
- Education in Egypt
- List of universities in Egypt
