= MSA University =

Private university in Giza, Egypt

Coordinates: 29.956673°N 30.958153°E

October University for Modern Sciences and Arts
- جامعة أكتوبر للعلوم الحديثة والآداب
- Other name: MSA
- Motto: The Best of British Higher Education in Egypt
- Type: Private University
- Established: 1996; 30 years ago
- Founder: Nawal El-Degwi
- President: Prof. Nader Elbokle
- Principal: Nawal El-Degwi
- Location: 26 July Mehwar Road intersection with Wahat Road, sixth October City. Egypt., Giza, Egypt
- Campus: 6th of October, Dokki
- Colors: Gold & white
- Website: msa.edu.eg

October University for Modern Sciences and Arts (Arabic: جامعة أكتوبر للعلوم الحديثة والآداب), known simply as MSA University, is a prominent private university located in Giza, Egypt. It was founded in 1996 by Dr. Nawal El-Degwi, a pioneer of the Egyptian private education. The university is accredited by the Egyptian and British ministry of education and graduate students can study in Britain without any equivalence.

== History ==
MSA was established in 1996.

== Faculties ==
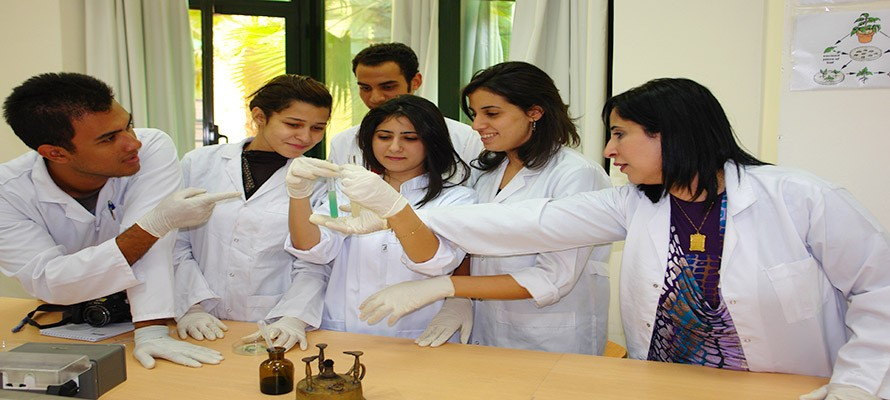
Biotech students at MSA attend drug design lab.

The university has ten faculties:

1. Computer Science
2. Pharmacy
3. Mass Communication
4. Management Sciences
5. Engineering
6. Biotechnology
7. Arts and Design
8. Oral and Dental Medicine
9. Languages
10. Physiotherapy
11. Nutrition and Food Technology

== British validation ==
MSA was the pioneer in Egypt to validate its programs with British Universities in 2002.

It is the first Egyptian university to grant its graduates a dual-origin bachelor's degree; namely a British degree from Middlesex (2002–2014), Bedfordshire (2014-present) or Greenwich (2002–present) universities, and another Egyptian degree which is accredited by the Egyptian Supreme Council for Universities. Thus, MSA University graduates enjoy the privilege of attaining scholarships and have the chance to pursue their MA and PhD studies in the United Kingdom.
