= Pharos University in Alexandria =

Private university in Alexandria, Egypt

Coordinates: 31.2077°N 29.9603°E

- جامعة فاروس بالإسكندرية
- Type: Private University
- Established: 2006
- Founders: Mohamed Ragab
- Accreditation: The Supreme Council of Egyptian Universities & the Ministry of Higher Education
- Affiliation: Association of Arab Universities / Euro-Mediterranean Universities Union / Francophone Universities Agency
- President: Prof. Mahmoud Mohy El Din
- Undergraduates: ~12,000
- Postgraduates: ~170
- Location: Alexandria, Egypt
- Campus: Urban
- Website: https://www.pua.edu.eg/

Pharos University in Alexandria (PUA) جامعة فاروس بالإسكندرية is the first private university in Alexandria, Egypt. The first Egyptian private university in Alexandria, established by Republican Decrees Nos. 252 of 2006, 302 of 2009, and 659 of 2020, it is an accredited university whose degrees are equivalent to those from the Supreme Council of Egyptian Universities and the Ministry of Higher Education.

As internationalization is one of PUA’s key strategic goals, PUA has built numerous collaborative links with European, American, and Asian universities with which it works closely to ensure its students receive a global standard of education. Collaborations include various activities such as staff and student exchange, program development, joint research, and Erasmus+ programs. Moreover, PUA currently offers two international degree programs with its international partners, the first is a BSc in six Engineering disciplines in partnership with the Royal Institute of Technology in Stockholm (KTH), Sweden, and the second degree is in Business & Management validated by Technological University Dublin (TU Dublin), Ireland.

== Overview ==
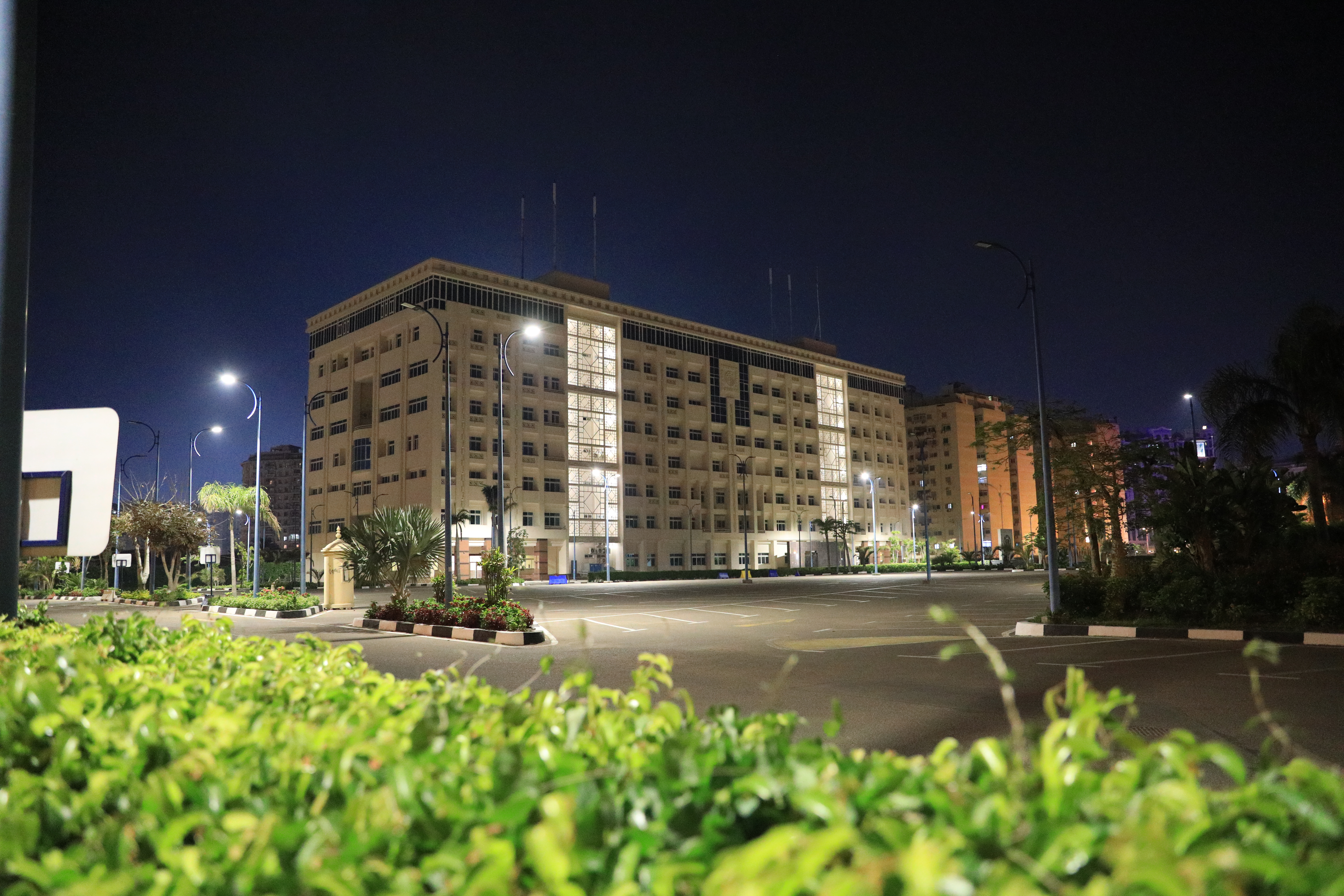
Pharos University campus Pharos University Great Hall

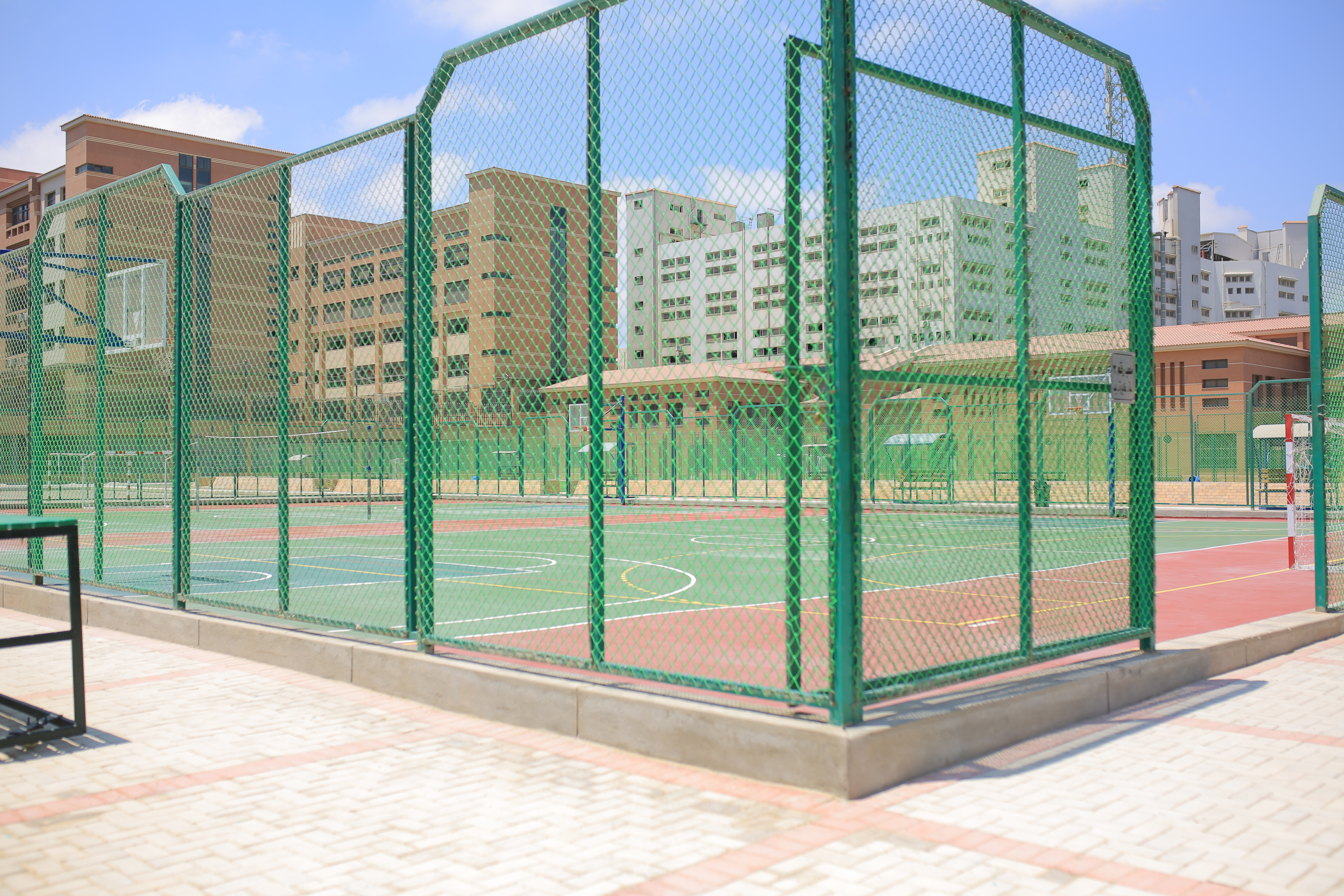
Pharos University Playgrounds

The university obtained a license from the Egyptian Supreme Council of Private Universities to begin operation in the 2006–2007 academic year. It includes twelve faculties: Pharmacy, Dentistry, Engineering, Languages and Translation, Financial and Administrative Sciences, Legal Studies and International Relations, Tourism and Hotel Management, Applied Health Sciences Technology, Mass Communication, Physical Therapy, Arts and Design, Computer Science & Artificial Intelligence.

The University of Pharos was established in accordance with the latest internationally acknowledged standards and parameters regarding higher education quality, and is supported with advanced highly equipped scientific laboratories. The University has signed a series of cooperation agreements with a number of European and American universities (Euro-Mediterranean universities union) in order to benefit from their advanced modern teaching methodologies and sustainable development in the various fields of science, as well as the application of international quality systems. In accordance with that, many student and faculty staff member exchange programs are organized between PUA and other universities in order to take advantage of the expertise of those universities and achieve further development.

== Faculty of Pharmacy ==
The Faculty of Pharmacy, Pharos University awards a Bachelor degree in Pharmacy, accredited by both the Supreme Council of Egyptian Universities and the Ministry of Higher Education. The faculty also obtained the NAQAAE accreditation twice; first in 2016, and second in 2021.

The Faculty of Pharmacy offers the Doctor of Pharmacy (Pharm. D) and Pharm. D Clinical programs. Studying these programs requires (6) years of study, with the penultimate year being allocated for teaching intensive clinical courses, whereas the final year is for intensive clinical training in hospital wards and health care centers.

The faculty comprises the six following departments:

- Pharmaceutical Chemistry (PC)
- Pharmacognosy and Natural Products (PG)
- Pharmacology and Therapeutics (PL)
- Microbiology and Immunology (PM)
- Clinical Pharmacy & Pharmacy Practice (PN)
- Pharmaceutics & Pharmaceutical Technology (PP)

== Faculty of Dentistry ==
The Faculty of Dentistry, Pharos University awards a Bachelor degree in Oral and Dental Surgery, accredited by both the Supreme Council of Egyptian Universities and the Ministry of Higher Education. The faculty is also accredited from the National Authority for Quality Assurance and Accreditation in Education NAQAAE

The Faculty of Dentistry comprises eight scientific departments divided into:

  *Academic Departments:

- Department of Oral Biology
- Department of Oral Pathology

  *Clinical Departments:

- Department of Oral Medicine and Periodontology
- Department of Oral and Maxillofacial Surgery
- Department of Prosthetic Dentistry (Fixed and Removable)
- Department of Orthodontics
- Department of Restorative Dentistry and Dental Biomaterials
- Department of Pediatric and Community Dentistry

== Faculty of Physical Therapy ==
The Faculty of Physical Therapy, Pharos University awards a bachelor degree in physical therapy, accredited by both the Supreme Council of Egyptian Universities and the Ministry of Higher Education. It is the one and only Faculty of Physical Therapy in the city of Alexandria.

Departments :

- Basic Science
- Biomechanics
- Physical Therapy for Internal Medicine and Geriatrics
- Physical Therapy for Women Health
- Physical Therapy for Neurology and Neurosurgery
- Physical Therapy for Pediatrics and Its Surgery
- Physical Therapy for Orthopedic Surgery
- Physical Therapy for Integumentary

== Faculty of Applied Health Sciences Technology ==
The Faculty of Applied Health Sciences Technology, Pharos University awards BSC. degree in Applied Medical Sciences in its different specialties, accredited by both the Supreme Council of Egyptian Universities and the Ministry of Higher Education.

Departments :

- Department of Medical Laboratory Technology
- Department of Biomedical Equipment Technology
- Department of Radiology and Medical Imaging Technology
- Department of Nutrition and Food Safety Technology
- Department of Optical Technology
- Department of Dental Prostheses Manufacture Technology
- Department of Critical Care and Anesthesia Technology

== Faculty of Engineering ==
The Faculty of Engineering, Pharos University awards a Bachelor degree in Engineering in its different specialties, accredited by both the Supreme Council of Egyptian Universities and the Ministry of Higher Education. The faculty is also accredited from the National Authority for Quality Assurance and Accreditation in Education NAQAAE

The Faculty of Engineering has a partnership agreement (joint program) with the Royal Institute of Technology in Sweden (KTH)

The faculty consists of the following departments:

- Architectural Engineering Department
- Construction Engineering & Management Department
- Computer Engineering Department
- Electrical Engineering Department:
  - Electrical Power Engineering & Control Section
  - Electronics & Communications Engineering Section
- Mechanical Engineering Department:
  - Mechanical Power Engineering Section
  - Industrial & Manufacturing Engineering Section
- Petrochemical Engineering Department

== Faculty of Computer Science & Artificial Intelligence ==
Computer science forms the foundation of our digital age, enabling us to develop software, algorithms, and systems that power our modern world. Artificial intelligence, on the other hand, represents the forefront of innovation, as we teach machines to simulate human intelligence and decision-making.

The Faculty of Computer Science & Artificial Intelligence, Pharos University includes the following departments each with its specific specialization:

- Computer Science Department
  - Computer Science
  - Cybersecurity
- Artificial Intelligence & Machine Learning Department
  - Artificial Intelligence
- Data Science Department
  - Data Science

== Faculty of Financial & Administrative Sciences ==
The Faculty of Financial & Administrative Sciences, Pharos University awards a Bachelor Degree in Financial and Administrative Sciences, accredited by both the Supreme Council of Egyptian Universities and the Ministry of Higher Education. The faculty is also accredited from the National Authority for Quality Assurance and Accreditation in Education NAQAAE

The Faculty of Financial & Administrative Sciences also awards dual degree with the Technological University in Dublin (TU Dublin). The dual degree program grants the graduates a competitive advantage in the labor market. It also gives an academic advantage in continuing their post-graduate studies in Ireland without needing an equivalency.

The Faculty of Financial And Administrative Sciences includes the following Programs each with its specific specialization:

- Marketing
- Finance
- Accounting

== Faculty of Tourism and Hotel Management ==
The Faculty of Tourism and Hotel Management, Pharos University awards a Bachelor Degree in Science in Hotel Management or Tourism, accredited by both the Supreme Council of Egyptian Universities and the Ministry of Higher Education. The faculty is also accredited from the National Authority for Quality Assurance and Accreditation in Education NAQAAE

The Faculty of Tourism and Hotel Management includes the following departments:

- Hotel Management Department
  - International Hotel Management
  - Hospitality Management Entrepreneurship
  - Mass Catering Management
  - Hospitality Marketing
- Tourism Department
  - Tourism Destination Marketing
  - Tourism Planning and Development
  - Tourism and Travel Business
  - Tourism, Leisure and Event Management

== Faculty of Arts and Design ==
The Faculty of Arts and Design, Pharos University awards a bachelor degree in Arts and Design in its different specialties, accredited and approved by the Supreme Council of Egyptian Universities and the Ministry of Higher Education.

The Faculty of Arts and Design includes the following departments:

- Décor Department
  - Interior Design Program
  - Expressive Arts Program ( Design for Theater, Cinema and Television )
- Graphics Department
  - Graphic Design Program
  - Illustration Program
- Media Arts Department
  - Digital Media Program
  - Animation and Video Film Program
- Painting Department
  - Drawing and Painting Program
  - Mural Design Program
- Fashion Design Department

== Faculty of Mass Communication ==
The Faculty of Mass Communication, Pharos University awards a bachelor degree in Mass communications, accredited by both the Supreme Council of Egyptian Universities and the Ministry of Higher Education.

Specialization begins in the second year in the following academic programs:

- Digital Media Platforms Program
- Public Relations, Advertising and Marketing communications Program
- Digital Broadcasting & Television production program

The specific specialization begins in the third year as follows:

- Digital Media Platforms Program
  - Digital journalism production Track.
  - Social Platforms Track.
- Public Relations, Advertising and Marketing communications Program
  - Digital Public Relations Track.
  - Digital Marketing Communications Track.
  - Digital advertising Track.
- Digital Broadcasting & Television production program
  - Television production Track.
  - Digital production Track.

== Faculty of Languages & Translation ==
The Faculty of Languages & Translation, Pharos University awards a Bachelor Degree of Arts to its graduates in their chosen specialization (Linguistic Engineering / English / French / Chinese / Spanish/ Turkish). This degree is accredited by both the Supreme Council of Egyptian Universities and the Ministry of Higher Education.

The Faculty of Languages & Translation includes The Following Departments:

- Department of Linguistic Engineering
- Department of English Language
- Department of French Language
- Department of Chinese Language
- Department of Spanish Language
- Department of Turkish Language

== Faculty of Legal Studies and International Relations ==
The Faculty of Legal Studies and International Relations, Pharos University awards a Bachelor Degree in Legal Studies and International Relation, accredited by both the Supreme Council of Egyptian Universities and the Ministry of Higher Education.

The Faculty of Legal studies and International Relations includes the following departments, each offering different subjects:

- Islamic Law (Shari’ah) Department
- Civil Law Department
- Procedural Law Department
- Commercial & Maritime Law Department
- Criminal Law Department
- Public Law Department
- Public International Law Department
- Private International Department
- Philosophy And History Of Law Department
- Political Economy And Public Finance Department

== See also ==
- Education in Egypt
- List of universities in Egypt
