= Zagazig University =

University in Zagazig, Egypt

Coordinates: 30.5894°N 31.4823°E

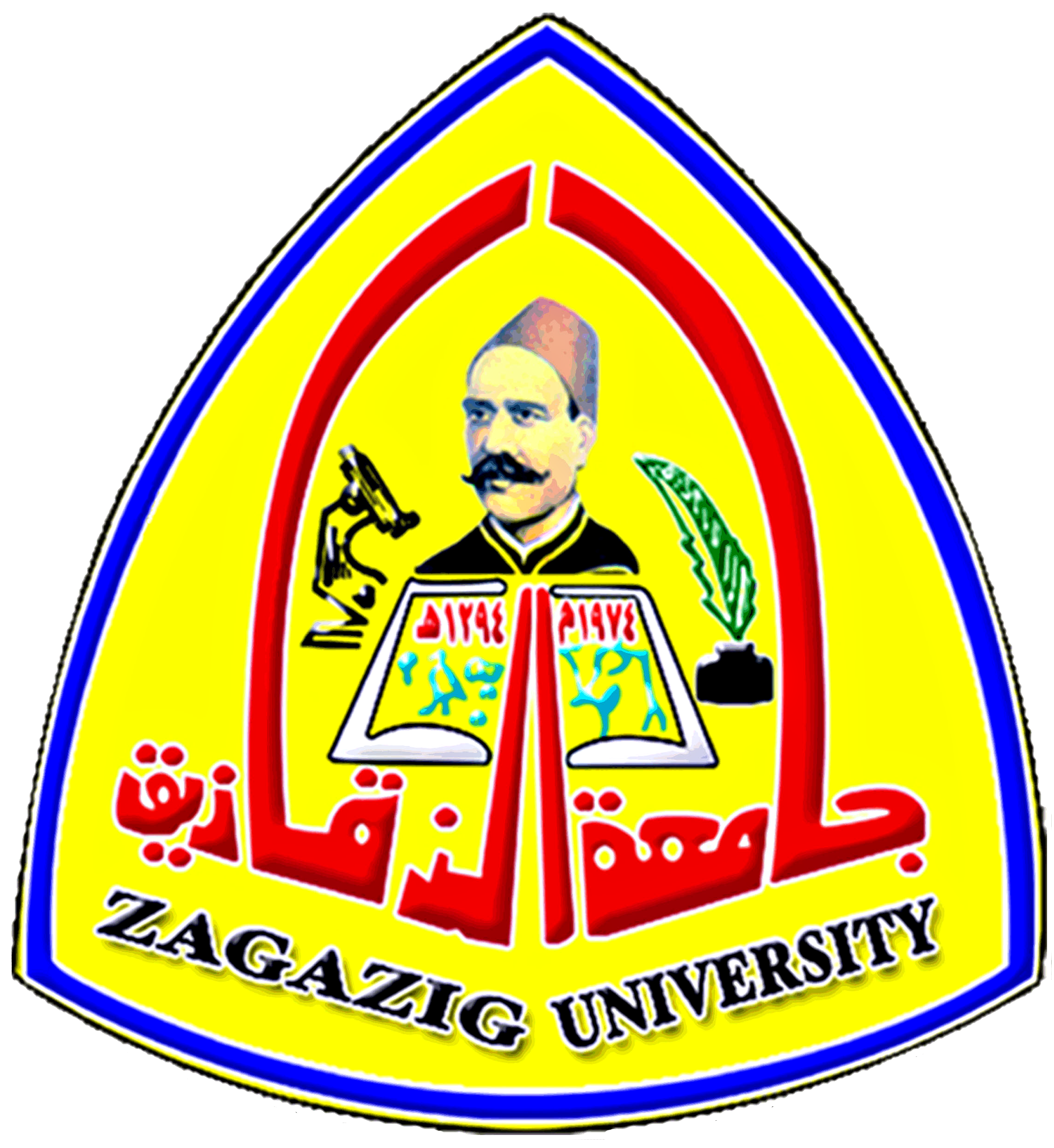
- Type: Public
- Established: 1974; 52 years ago
- President: Khalid A. Eldrandaly
- Academic staff: 7,222
- Students: 163,709
- Postgraduates: 13,939
- Location: Ash Sharqiyah, Egypt
- Campus: Zagazig, Ash Sharqiyah
- Colors: Yellow, red, and blue
- Website: www.zu.edu.eg

University rankings

Global – Overall
- QS World: 1201–1400 (2024)
- THE World: 801–1000 (2024)
- USNWR Global: 362 (2024)

Zagazig University (Egyptian Arabic: جامعة الزقازيق, romanized: Jāmiʿat az-Zaqāzīq) is a public university located in the city of Zagazig, Sharqia, Egypt. Founded in 1974, It comprises colleges and scientific institutes belonging to most branches of human knowledge, totaling 16 colleges and two institutes (Civilizations and Asian Studies), with a third under construction (the Oncology Institute), and more than 600 scientific departments.

The university employs 5,000 faculty members holding doctoral degrees and approximately 2,500 teaching assistants and instructors. The Zagazig University has chosen an image of Ahmed Urabi as its emblem.

== History ==
Zagazig University began as a branch of Ain Shams University in 1970. On 14 April 1974, it gained independence through a decree, becoming a standalone institution with six faculties that it had retained from its time as a branch university.

Zagazig University Rankings

- 4 in Best Global Universities in Egypt
- 6 in Best Global Universities in Africa
- 314 in Best Global Universities (tie)

== Faculties ==
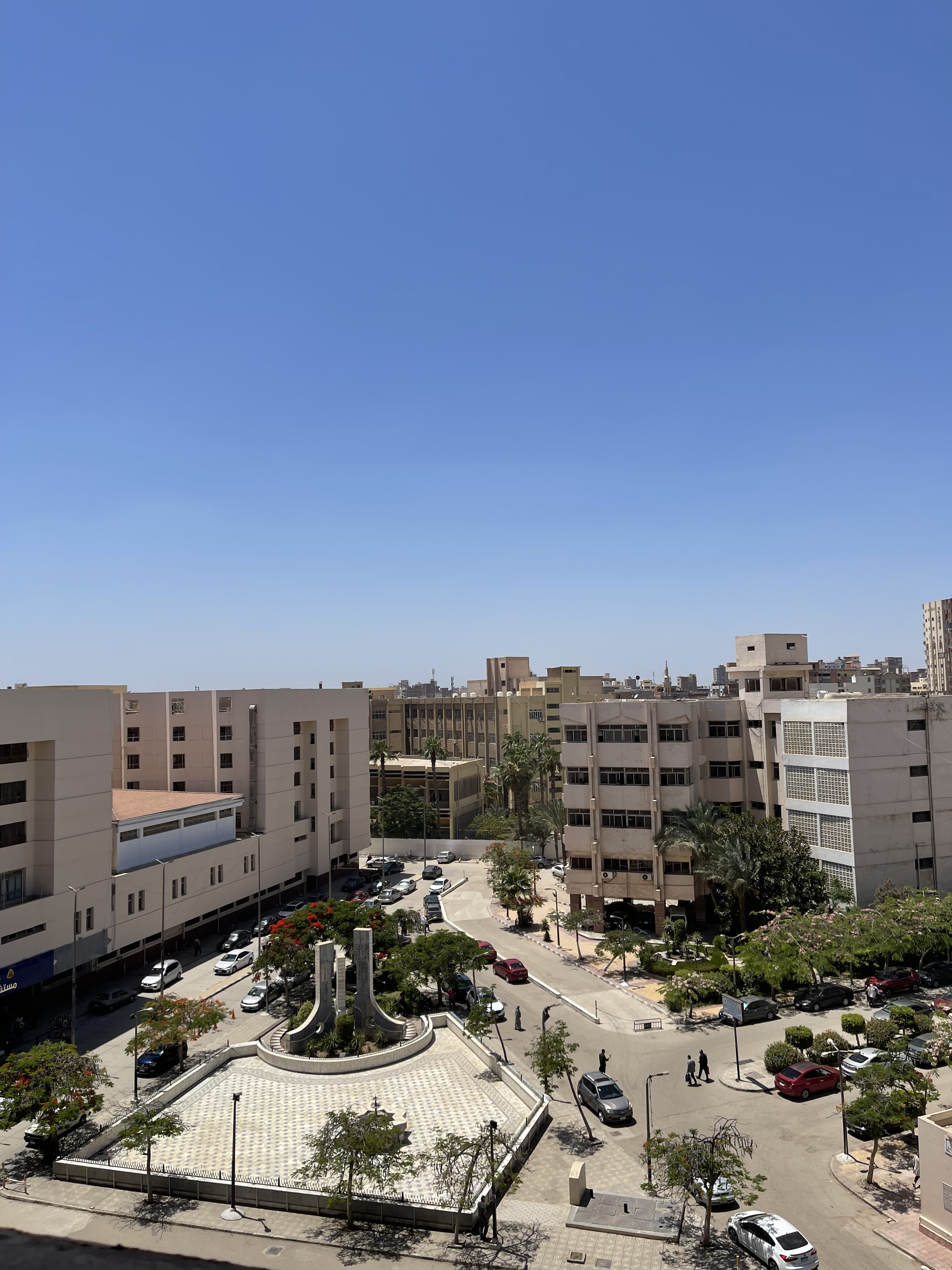
The Faculty of Medicine in Zagazig University

Zagazig University includes 19 faculties:

- Faculty of Education
- Faculty of Commerce
- Faculty of Agriculture
- Faculty of Medicine
- Faculty of Veterinary Medicine
- Faculty of Science
- Faculty of Law
- Faculty of Pharmacy
- Faculty of Arts
- Faculty of Engineering
- Faculty of Specific Education
- Faculty of Nursing
- Faculty of Physical Education for Males
- Faculty of Physical Education for Females
- Faculty of Computers and Informatics
- Faculty of Technology and Development
- The Higher Institute of Civilizations
- Asian Studies and Research Institute
- Mubarak Institute of Oncology

== Notable alumni ==
- Ayman Al-Hendy
- Muntaser Ibrahim
- Hani Sewilam
- Dalal Abdel Aziz
- Khaled Ali
- Ramadan Shallah
- Faten Zahran Mohamed
- Mohamed Badie
- Mahmoud Ezzat
- Miral El-Tahawy

== See also ==
- List of Islamic educational institutions
- List of universities in Egypt
- List of medical schools in Egypt
- Education in Egypt
