= Nahda University =

Private university in Egypt

Coordinates: 29.0501°N 31.1194°E

Nahda University in Beni Suef
- Established: 2006
- President: Hossam El-Malahi
- Academic staff: 720
- Students: 9000
- Location: Nahda St., Beni Suef, Egypt
- Campus: 5 acres (2.0 ha); Urban
- Website: Official website

Nahda University in Beni Suef (NUB) is located in Upper Egypt. It was established in 2006. It is a private university run by the Thebes Education Group.
