= Galala University =

Private university in Suez, Egypt

- جامعة الجلالة
- Type: National
- Established: August 2020; 6 years ago
- President: Dr. Mohamed El-Shinawi
- Location: Suez, Egypt
- Campus: Main campus in Al Galala
- Language: English
- Website: www.gu.edu.eg

Galala University (Arabic: جامعة الجلالة) is a national, non-profit Egyptian university located in Al Galala in Suez. The university comprises 13 faculties covering various academic disciplines and was established by a presidential decree in August 2020.

== Location ==
Galala University is situated on the Galala Plateau in the Suez Governorate, overlooking the Red Sea. It is positioned 700 meters above sea level, between Ain Sokhna and Zaafarana.

== Project ==
The Galala Plateau project was developed with the participation of the Armed Forces Engineering Authority, along with approximately 100 Egyptian national companies, and over 150,000 workers, engineers, and employees. The university is a key component of this project, spanning an area of 173.5 feddans.

== Studying system ==
Galala University follows a credit hour system, allowing students to select their courses each semester under academic supervision. This system ensures that students receive guidance in managing their academic progress and maintaining their ability to continue their studies effectively.

In May 2021, Galala University signed an agreement with Arizona State University to offer dual degrees in various fields, including Engineering, Social and Human Sciences, Basic Sciences, Administrative Sciences, Media Production, and Art & Design. Additionally, students in Pharmacy, Physical Therapy, Nursing, and Food Industries receive an accredited certificate from Galala University, with administrative support provided by CINTANA, Arizona State University's commercial partner.

== Faculties and centers ==
Galala University comprises 13 faculties and offers 66 academic programs across various disciplines, including medicine, science, engineering, and media and communication. In addition to its undergraduate programs, the university features a college for graduate studies, four research and technology centers, the Higher Academy of Sciences, a university hospital, and housing facilities for both students and faculty members. Upon full completion, the university is designed to accommodate up to 12,750 students across its three development phases.

=== Faculties ===
- Faculty of social and human science
- Faculty of administrative science
- Faculty of Mass media and Communication
- Faculty of Arts
- Faculty of Engineering
- Faculty of Computer science
- Faculty of Architecture
- Faculty of Food and Food industries
- Faculty of Medicine
- Faculty of dentistry
- Faculty of Physical Therapy
- Faculty of Pharmacy (pharma D Program)

== Faculty of engineering ==
- Construction Engineering & Specialized Construction Program.
- Architecture Engineering:
  - Architectural Design & Digital Architecture Program.
  - Environmental Architecture & Building Technology Program.
- Mechanical Engineering:
  - Mechatronics & Industrial Automation Engineering Program.
  - Material & Manufacturing Engineering Program.
- Electrical Engineering:
  - Power Engineering.
  - Computer Engineering Program.
  - Artificial Intelligence Engineering Program.

== See also ==
- Education in Egypt
- List of universities in Egypt
