= King Salman International University =

University in South Sinai, Egypt

- جامعة الملك سلمان الدولية
- Type: National
- Established: 2020
- President: Prof. Ashraf Hussein
- Location: South Sinai, Egypt; 29°35′19″N 32°46′20″E
- Campus: Ras Sedr El Tor Sharm El Sheikh
- Language: English
- Website: www.ksiu.edu.eg

King Salman International University (Arabic: جامعة الملك سلمان) is a national (Ahleya), non-profit Egyptian university located in Sinai across three campuses in Ras Sedr, El Tor and Sharm El Sheikh. The university includes 13 faculties in different fields of study. It was established in August 2020 by a decision of Abdel Fattah El-Sisi, President of Egypt, and was named after Salman of Saudi Arabia.

== Location ==
King Salman International University is located in South Sinai with campuses in the cities of Ras Sedr, Al Tur, and Sharm El Sheikh, each equipped with various facilities.

== Studying System ==
The university operates on a credit-hour system, enabling students to select courses each semester under academic guidance that monitors their progress and ensures their ability to continue their studies.

== Faculties and Centers ==
King Salman International University contains 13 faculties, and offers 33 programs in fields of study ranging from medicine, science, engineering, media, arts, hospitality and communication.

Faculties:

Ras Sedr Branch

- Faculty of Administrative Sciences
- Faculty of Desert Agriculture
- Faculty of Veterinary Medicine
- Faculty of Pharmacy
- Faculty of Basic Sciences
- Faculty of Community Sciences

El Tor Branch

- Faculty of Engineering
- Faculty of Computer Science and Engineering
- Faculty of Technological Industries
- Faculty of Medicine
- Faculty of Dentistry
- Faculty of Nursing

Sharm El Sheikh Branch

- Faculty of Al Alsun and Applied Languages
- Faculty of Art and Design

- interior architecture

- graphic design and branding

- Faculty of Tourism and Hospitality
- Faculty of Architecture

== Faculty of Engineering ==
the faculty offers the following programs:

- Mechanical Engineering Department:
  - Mechatronics Engineering Program.
- Electrical Engineering Department:
  - Renewable Energy Engineering Program.
  - Electronics & Communications Engineering Program.
  - Computer Engineering Program.
  - Artificial Intelligence Engineering Program.

== See also ==
- Education in Egypt
- List of universities in Egypt
