= Minya University =

Public university in Minia governorate, Egypt

Minia University
- جامعة المنيـا
- Type: Public university
- Established: 1976
- Affiliations: AARU; Supreme Council of universities (Egypt)
- President: Mustafa Abdel Nabi Abdel Rahman Ahmed
- Academic staff: ~3839 faculty members
- Students: ~57,930 (Fall 2019)
- Undergraduates: ~55,003 (Fall 2019)
- Postgraduates: ~2927 (Fall 2019)
- Location: Minia, Egypt; 28°7′24.3″N 30°44′27.1″E
- Campus: Urban
- Website: minia.edu.eg

Minia University is a public university in Minia, Egypt. It was established in 1976 by virtue of Republican Decree No. (93), separating it from Assiut University. The campus is north of Minia. Its emblem is Nefertiti Bust.

== University logo ==
The image of Queen Nefertiti was chosen within an open book as a logo for the university. The Nefertiti Bust is also the slogan of Minya governorate due to its historical and ideological role that it played in the history of ancient Egypt. The head of Nefertiti was found in the Tel Amarna region, to the south of Minya Governorate.

== Faculties ==
The university has 17 faculties:

- Faculty of Agriculture
- Faculty of Education
- Faculty of Science
- Faculty of Arts (off campus)
- Faculty of Fine Arts
- Faculty of Engineering (off campus)
- Faculty of Medicine
- Faculty of Physical Education
- Faculty of Dentistry (off campus)
- Faculty of Dar Al-Uloom (Islamic teachings)
- Faculty of Nursing
- Faculty of Tourism and Hotels
- Faculty of Foreign Languages
- Faculty of Pharmacy
- Faculty of Computer Science
- Faculty of Specific Education
- Faculty of Kindergarten

== Activities ==
In 2018, the university, in conjunction with the Ministry of Higher Education and Scientific Research, spearheaded a week-long sports event for people with disabilities. It was the first of its kind in Egypt's history.

== See also ==
- List of Islamic educational institutions
- Education in Egypt
- List of universities in Egypt
