= Aswan University =

University in Aswan, Egypt

Coordinates: 23.9989°N 32.8599°E

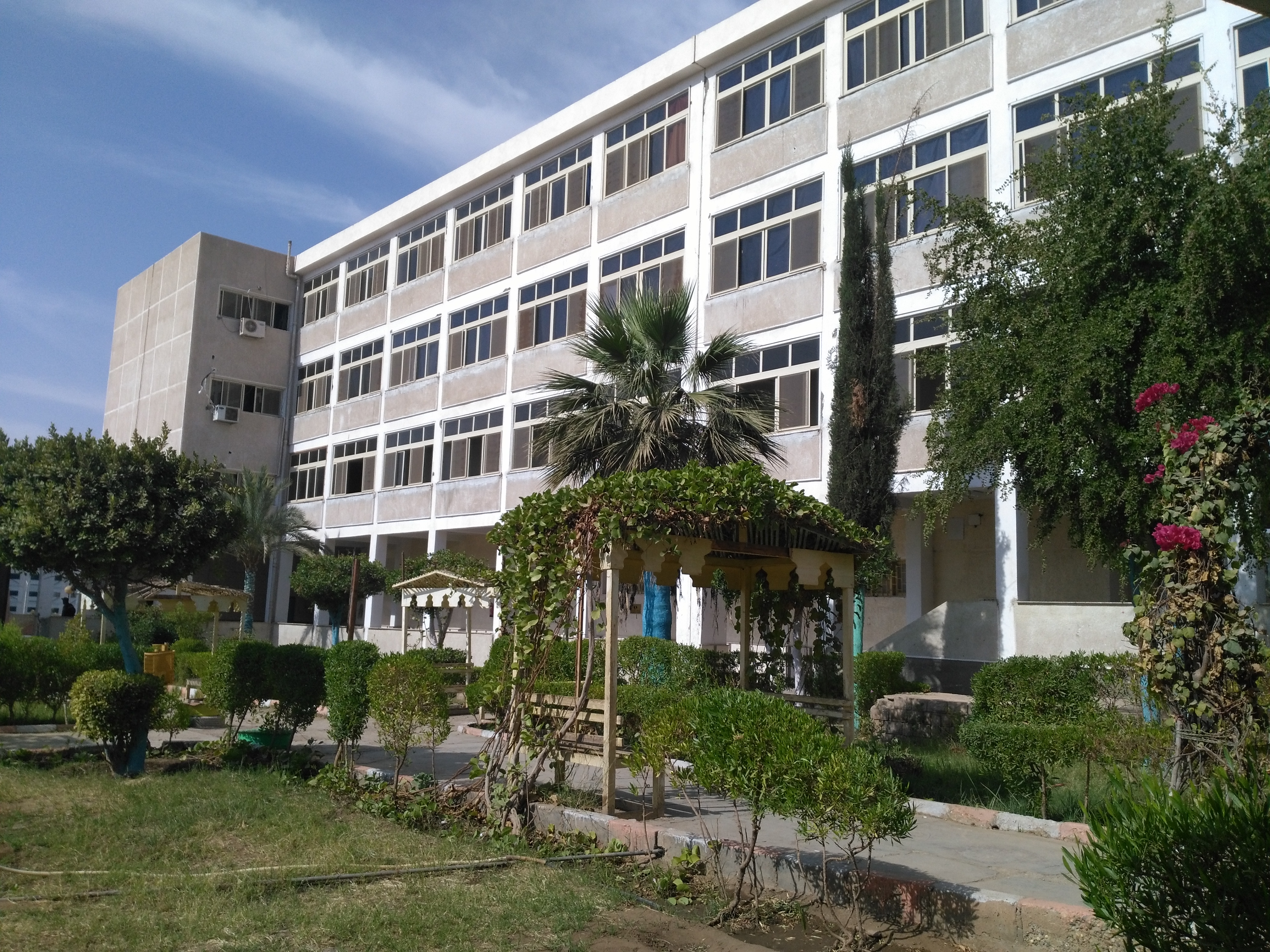
- Faculty of Engineering
- Established: 2012
- Location: Aswan, Egypt
- Website: Official website

University rankings

Global – Overall
- THE World: 401–500 (2021)

Regional – Overall
- THE Africa: =5 (2021)
- THE BRICS: 104 (2020)

Aswan University is a university located in Aswan, Egypt. Established in 2012, it was previously known as the Aswan branch of the South Valley University.

== History ==
Aswan University branch was established in 1974 as a branch of Assiut University. The study started on October of the academic year 1973/1974 in the faculty of education and the first bachelor was given in 1978 then started the enrollment in master's degree in the faculty of science in the academic year 1977/1978 after that the enrollment in Ph.D. started in the academic year 1977/1978. In 1995 the presidential decree no. 23 of 1995 was issued to establish South Valley University and then Aswan branch was affiliated to it, new faculties were established (faculty of arts – faculty of social work – faculty of engineering).

In 2012 Aswan University was constructed as a governmental university by the presidential decree no. 311 in 2012 and it now included 15 faculties (the faculties of arts, education, science, social work, engineering, energy engineering, veterinary medicine, agriculture, nursing, languages and translation, medicine, fisheries technology, commerce, specific education, and archaeology).

== Campus ==
=== Main campus ===
The university main campus is located in Sahary City, Airport Road which occupies 400 acres.

=== New campus ===
In addition to the new headquarters in Aswan Al-Gadeda that occupies 98.5 acres. Aswan university includes 6 headquarters and 6 university dorms in Aswan City.

== Faculties ==
=== Humanities faculties ===
- Faculty of Arts
- Faculty of Commerce
- Faculty of Dar El-Ulum
- Faculty of Al-Alsun
- Faculty of Social Work
- Faculty of Education
- Faculty of Physical Education
- Faculty of Law
- Faculty of Specialized Education
- Faculty of Archaeology

=== Scientific faculties ===
- Faculty of Engineering
- Faculty of Energy Engineering
- Faculty of Medicine
- Faculty of Agriculture
- Faculty of Science
- Faculty of Nursing
- Faculty of Veterinary Medicine
- Faculty of Fish & Fisheries Technology

=== Faculties under construction ===
- Faculty of Oral and Dental Medicine
- Faculty of Tourism and Hotel Management

== Institutes ==
- Institute of Nursing Education
- Institute of African Research and Studies

== See also ==
- Education in Egypt
- List of universities in Egypt
