= Fayoum University =

Public university in Faiyum, Egypt

Coordinates: 29°19′16″N 30°50′08″E

- (Arabic: جامعة الفيوم, Jame'at al-fayoum)
- Former names: Fayoum Campus, Cairo University
- Type: Public
- Established: 2005
- President: Prof. Yasser Hatata
- Faculty: 1,800
- Students: 25,000
- Location: Fayoum, Egypt
- Campus: Urban, Fayoum, Egypt
- Website: http://www.fayoum.edu.eg/English/

Fayoum University (FU; Arabic: جامعة الفيوم, Jame'at al-fayoum) is a public university located in the Egyptian city of Faiyum in northern Egypt. From 1976 to 2005, Fayoum University was a public institution within the University of Cairo. In August 2005, the university was established as an independent campus with 2,000 faculty members and an enrollment of about 25 000 students. The city of Fayoum is an oasis located approximately 63 miles southwest of Cairo and is noted for its agricultural production and tourism.

== History ==
In 1975, the Faculty of Education in Fayoum was established as one of the faculties affiliated to Cairo University.

In 2018, the university held a well-attended sand skiing event in Fayoum with students from around Egypt joining in.

== Courses and campus ==
Fayoum University offers undergraduate programs and graduate programs, as well as open education opportunities via its 14 faculties.

== Faculties ==
- Faculty of Education
- Faculty of Agriculture
- Faculty of Engineering
- Faculty of Social Work
- Faculty of Dar Al-Uloom
- Faculty of Science
- Faculty of Tourism and Hotels
- Faculty of Specific Education
- Faculty of Archaeology
- Faculty of Medicine
- Faculty of Pharmacy
- Faculty of Dentistry
- Faculty of Arts
- Faculty of Computer science and Information
- Faculty of Early Childhood Education
- Faculty of Nursing

=== University facilities ===
- Library Facilities: Fayoum University libraries own more than 67043 Arabic books and 30366 foreign books.
- Special Facilities: Teaching Hotel, Sports Hall, Student Activities Center, and the University Theatre

== Fayoum University Hospital ==
With its full capacity of 350 beds, the Fayoum University Hospital renders top-notch medical services to the citizens of Fayoum. It is also a center for educational and medical services.

== Governance and administration ==
Fayoum university is a state-owned campus administrated by a president assisted by three vice-presidents.

=== Past presidents ===
- Professor Abdel Hamid Abdel Tawab (2011–present)
- Professor Ahmed M. El Gohary (2008–2011)
- Professor Galal M. Said (2005–2011)

== See also ==
- Education in Egypt
- List of universities in Egypt
