= Delta University for Science and Technology =

Private university in Mansoura, Egypt

Coordinates: 31.442°N 31.494°E

Delta University for Science and Technology, was founded in 2007 by the higher education system of Egypt, is an Egyptian private university, located in Mansoura.

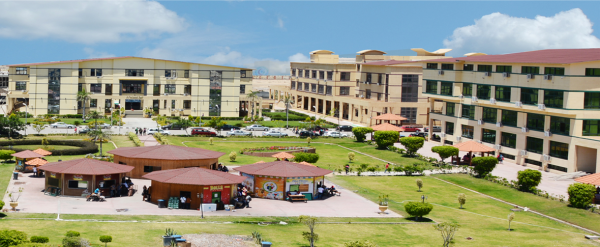
Delta University Campus

Delta University for Science and Technology in Mansoura is one of the entities of Delta Group, established by presidential decree No. 147 for the year 2007 as the first private university in the Egyptian Delta and Lower Egypt. It is a University that operates according to the highest national and international accreditation standards and includes many faculties.

== Faculties ==
- Faculty of Engineering
- Faculty of Artificial Intelligence
- Faculty of Medicine
- Faculty of Oral & Dental Medicine
- Faculty of Pharmacy
- Faculty of Physical Therapy
- Faculty of Applied Health Science
- Faculty of Business Administration
- Faculty of Arts

== Faculty Of Engineering ==
The Faculty Departments offer the following degrees:

- Department of Civil Engineering:
  - Bachelor's Of Engineering In Construction Engineering (160Cr.).
  - Diploma Of Engineering Science In Civil Engineering.
  - Master Of Science In Civil Engineering.
- Department Of Architectural Engineering:
  - Bachelor's Of Architectural Engineering (160Cr.).
  - Dipolma Of Engineering Science In Architectural Engineering.
  - Master Of Science In Architectural Engineering.
- Department Of Electrical Engineering:
  - Bachelor's Of Electronics & Communications Engineering (160Cr.).
  - Diploma Of Engineering Science In Electronics & Communications Engineering.
  - Master Of Science In Electronics & Communications Engineering.
- Department Of Mechanical Engineering:
  - Bachelor's Mechatronics Engineering (160Cr.).

== Faculty Of Energy Engineering ==
The Faculty Departments offer the following programs as of 2024:

- Department Of Natural Gas & Petroleum Engineering.
- Department Of Sustainable & Renewable Energy Engineering.
- Department Of Petroleum Engineering.

== Facilities ==
Student Affairs and Education Deanship

The deanship of education and student affairs applies the admission policies, transfer procedures and students’ academic registration in accordance with the university regulations. It also follows up students’ scientific affairs till and after their graduation.

Students’ Activities

The university cares for developing students’ abilities through encouraging them to participate in different activities such as scientific, artistic, cultural, and sports activities that are financially supported by the university administration. Several playgrounds for football, table tennis, basketball and billiards that serve students activities have been established.

Physical Therapy Clinic

Hence, the university gives high priority for training Physical therapy students, Physical therapy clinic was established and it was provided with modern medical equipments and therapeutic equipments in order for students to get training and to serve the community as patients get treatment for free.

Oral and Dental Clinic

Hence, the university gives high priority for training dental students, oral and dental clinic was established and it was provided with modern medical equipments in order for students to get training and to serve the community as patients get treatment for free.

Library

Inside each faculty, there is a library which is provided with technological equipment and scientific references in different departments and fields in order for students to get benefit and scientific support.

Copy Center

The university has established three copy centers for copying lectures and handouts.

Transportation Services

The university provides students from different destinations with buses that transport them to and from university for annual fees decided by the university administration.

Cafeterias

Several cafeterias have been established which serves different meals, soft and hot drinks for students, staff and all employees for reasonable prices.

Parking

A wide area has been prepared as a parking for students’ cars.

Special Preparations

Taking into consideration students with special needs, the university buildings have been designed to serve them

== Location ==
Delta University for Science and Technology occupies a prime location on the Mediterranean coast in Gamasa, Dakahlia Governorate, on the International Coastal Road. The University benefits from its location. It is located between four provinces (Dakahlia, Kafr El-Sheikh, Elgharbia and Damietta). It lies about 50 km from Mansoura (the capital of Dakahlia Governorate), about 20 km from New Damietta, about 50 km from Kafr el-Sheikh, and about 100 km away from Tanta (capital of the Elgharbia Governorate).
