= Sohag University =

Public university in Sohag, Egypt

- جامعة سوهاج
- Type: Public
- Established: 2006
- President: Safa Mahmoud
- Administrative staff: A
- Undergraduates: 40,000
- Postgraduates: A
- Location: Sohag, Sohag Governorate, Egypt; 26°27′26″N 31°40′05″E
- Campus: Sohag
- Website: www.sohag-univ.edu.eg

Sohag University (Arabic: جامعة سوهاج) is a public university in Egypt. It is located in Sohag, on the western bank of the Nile.

== History ==
Sohag University became an independent university in 2006. Before 2006, it was part, and branch, of South Valley University which is located in Qena.

== Faculties, Colleges and Institutes ==
- Faculty of Agriculture
- Faculty of Arts
- Faculty of Commerce
- Faculty of Education
- Faculty of Engineering
- Faculty of Industrial Education
- Faculty of Medicine
- Faculty of Nursing
- Faculty of Science
- Faculty of Veterinary Medicine
- Faculty of Pharmacy
- Faculty of Computer and Information Technology

== See also ==
- Education in Egypt
- List of universities in Egypt
