= Menoufia University =

University in Egypt

Coordinates: 30.5656°N 31.0128°E

- جامعة المنوفية
- Type: Public
- Established: 1976; 50 years ago
- Faculty: Minufiya University Consists of a lot of faculties Faculty of Engineering; Faculty of Science; Faculty of Agriculture; Faculty of Arts; Faculty of Medicine; Faculty of Commerce; Faculty Of Education.
- Location: Shibin El Kom, Al Minufya, Al Minufya, Egypt
- Website: Official website

Menoufia University is one of the regional universities in Egypt, established in 1976. The university started with four colleges (the College of Agriculture, the College of Engineering, the College of Education, and the College of Electronic Engineering), then it expanded and established many of its affiliated colleges until it became comprising about 80000 students, 3000 faculty members and assistant staff.

The main headquarters of the university are located in Shebin El Kom. Currently, the university includes 13 colleges and one institute after the separation of the faculties of the university branch in Sadat City, which has become the University of Sadat City.

== See also ==
- List of Islamic educational institutions
- List of universities in Egypt
- Education in Egypt
