= New Mansoura University =

National university in New Mansoura, Egypt

- جامعة المنصورة الجديدة
- Type: National
- Established: 2021
- President: Prof. Dr. Moawad Muhammad Al-Khouli
- Location: New Mansoura, Egypt
- Campus: New Mansoura
- Language: English
- Website: www.nmu.edu.eg

New Mansoura University (Arabic: جامعة المنصورة الجديدة) is a national, non-profit Egyptian university located in New Mansoura in Dakahlia. The university includes 8 faculties in different fields of study. It was established by presidential decree in August 2020. It started accepting students in 2021.

== Location ==
New Mansoura University is located in the new planned city of New Mansoura, overlooking the International Coastal Road.

== Studying System ==
The study at the university is based on the credit hour system that allows students to choose the courses they register to study in each semester, under academic guidance that tracks the student’s progress and ability to continue their studies.

In May 2021, the NMU signed a protocol with Mansoura University that aims to promote cooperation with latter in "the fields of training and continuing medical education, and implement training programs of mutual interest and taking the benefit of the available capacities of Mansoura University's hospitals."

== Faculties and centers ==
As of 2021, NMU contains 8 faculties, and offers 28 programs, with 6 more faculties under construction.

Faculties:

- Faculty of Business
- Faculty of International Legal Transactions
- Faculty of Engineering
- Faculty of Computer Engineering & Science
- Faculty of Basic Sciences
- Faculty of Medicine
- Faculty of Dental Medicine
- Faculty of Pharmacy

Faculties under construction

- Faculty of Applied Health Technology
- Faculty of Nursing
- Faculty of Social and Human Sciences
- Faculty of Mass Communication
- Faculty of Postgraduate Studies

== Faculty of Engineering ==
The Faculty consists of the following programs:

- Mechanical Engineering:
  - Aeronautical & Aerospace Engineering Program.
  - Product Development Engineering Program.
  - Mechatronics Engineering Program.
  - Textile Engineering Program.
- Electrical Engineering:
  - Biomedical Engineering Program.
  - Energy Engineering & Energy Management Program.
  - Computer Engineering Program.
  - Artificial Intelligence Engineering Program.
- Petroleum & Gas Engineering Program.
- Environmental Architecture & Building Technology Program.
- Engineering & Technology Implementation of Civil Engineering Program.
