= Capital University (Egypt) =

Public university near Cairo, Egypt

- جامعة العاصمة
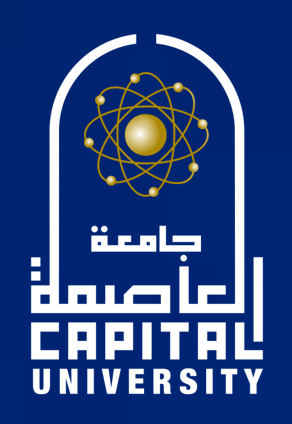
- Type: Public
- Established: July 26, 1980
- President: Elsayed Kandil
- Faculty: 5,156 (2021)
- Administrative staff: 6,520 (2021)
- Students: 197,175 (2021)
- Postgraduates: 14,160 (2021)
- Location: Helwan, Cairo Governorate, Egypt; 29°52′N 31°19′E
- Campus: Helwan
- Website: helwan.edu.eg

Capital University (formerly Helwan University) is a public university based in Helwan, Egypt, which is part of Greater Cairo on over 350 acres (140 ha). It comprises 23 faculties and two higher institutes in addition to 50 research centers.

== Overview ==
Capital University is a member of the Egyptian Supreme Council of Universities. It was established on July 26, 1980 by Act No. 70 of 1975 over 350 acres of land. It is the youngest of 3 major governmental universities in Cairo.

However, it goes back to the 19th century during the reign of Muhammad Ali of Egypt who established “The Operations School”. The fields of that school were the basis of many institutes that formed Helwan University later.

Although Capital University is the most recent of 3 major governmental universities in Cairo, it encompasses some of the oldest faculties not only in Egypt but also in the Middle East. The Faculty of Applied Arts, for example, was established in 1839, while the Faculty of Fine Arts and Art Education were established in 1908 and 1936 respectively.

== Location ==
The main campus of the university is in Helwan, Cairo. A number of faculties have been moved there, while others are still located in Zamalek, Boulaq, Giza, El Manyal, and Ain Shams.

== Presidents of Capital University ==
- Abdel Razek Abdel Fattah Ibrahim (1975–1979)
- Mohamed Ismail Alam al-Din (1979–1986)
- Kamal Mohamed Ahmad al-Sarraj (1986–1989)
- Mohamed Kamal Ahmad Al-Attar (1989–1993)
- Mohamed Mahmoud El-Gohary (1993–1997)
- Hassan Mohamed Hussein Hosni (1997–2002)
- Amr Ezzat Salama (2002–2004)
- Abdelhay Obeid (2004–2007)
- Abdullah Barakat (2007–2009)
- Mahmoud Nasser Al-Tayeb (2009–2011)
- Mohamed Abdel Hamid El-Nashar (2011–2012)
- Yasser Hosni Mohamed Saqr (2012–2013)
- Majed Fahmy Najm (2017–2021)
- Mamdouh Mahmoud Mahdy (2021–2022)
- Elsayed Ibrahim Mohamed Kandil (2022–present)

== Faculties of Capital University ==
- Faculty of Applied Arts (1839)
- Faculty of Fine Arts (1908)
- Faculty of Art Education (1932)
- Faculty of Music Education (1935)
- Faculty of Home Economics (1937)
- Faculty of Physical Education – Girls (1937)
- Faculty of Physical Education – Boys (1937)
- Faculty of Social Work (1947)
- Faculty of Engineering Mataria (1955)
- Faculty of Engineering Helwan (1959)
- Faculty of Commerce and Business Administration (1961)
- Faculty of Tourism and Hotels (1962)
- Faculty of Science (1980)
- Faculty of Education (1982)
- Faculty of Technology Education (1989)
- Faculty of Arts (1995)
- Faculty of Computers and Artificial Intelligence (1995)
- Faculty of Law (1995)
- Faculty of Pharmacy (1995)
- Faculty of Nursing (2006)
- Faculty of Medicine (2013)
- Faculty of Postgraduate Interdisciplinary Studies (2014)
- Technical Institute of Nursing (2014)
- National Intellectual Property Institute (2016)

== Central Library ==
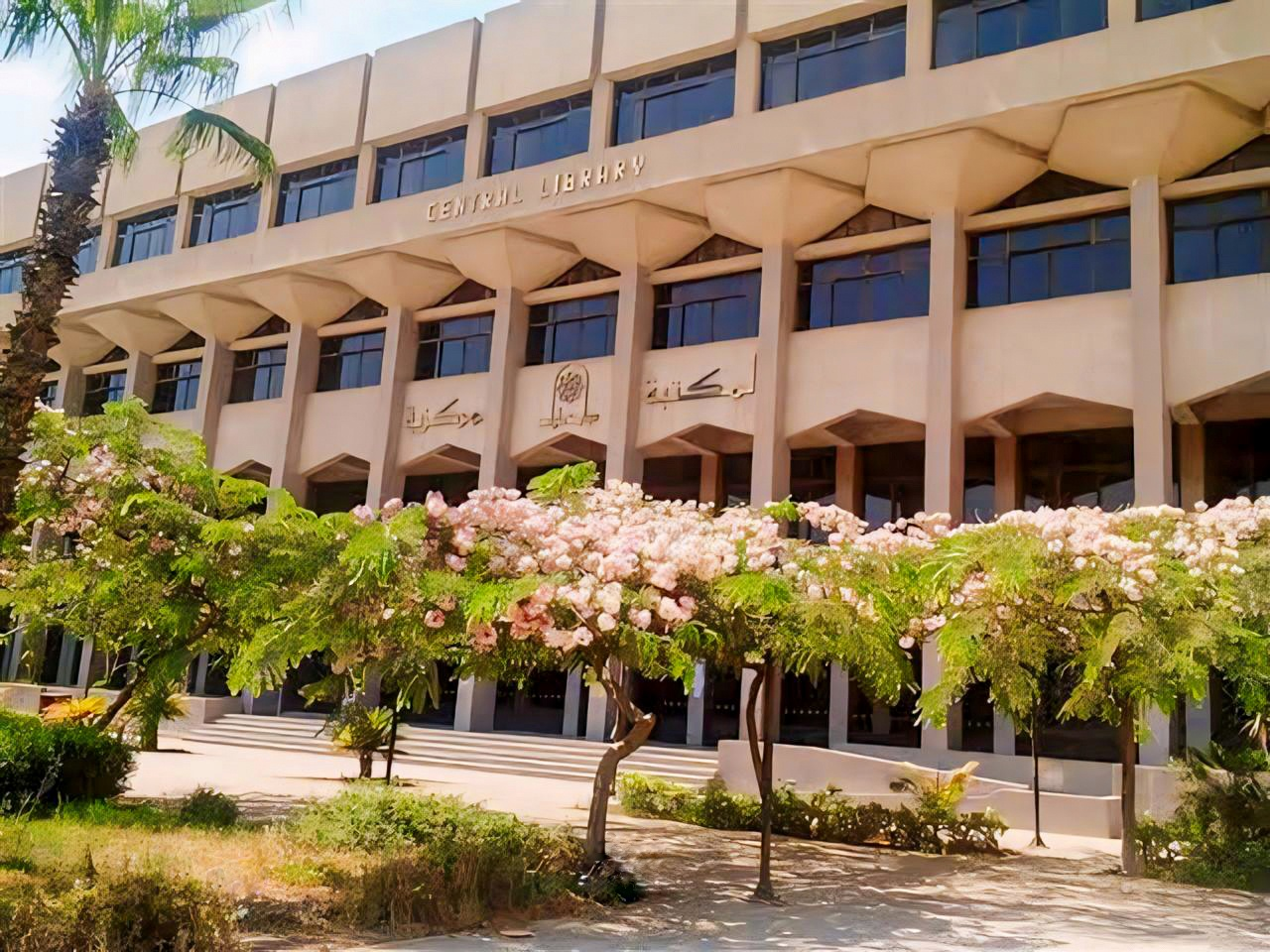
Central Library - Capital University

In addition to the Central Library, there are libraries for specialties in each faculty.

== Ranking ==
University rankings

Global – Overall
- QS World: 1201–1400 (2024)
- THE World: 1201–1500 (2024)
- USNWR Global: =1085 (2023)

According to Webometrics Ranking of World Universities, Helwan University is ranked 1987th in the world and tenth in Egypt.

In QS ranking 2020 Helwan University was rated 41st in The Arab Region and eighth in Egypt.

== See also ==
- List of Islamic educational institutions
- College of Fine Arts in Cairo
- Education in Egypt
- List of universities in Egypt
- Helwan University station
