= Suez Canal University =

Public university in Ismaïlia, Egypt

- جامعة قناة السويس
- Type: Public university
- Established: 1974
- President: Dr. Nasser Mandor
- Location: Ismaïlia, Egypt; 30°37′22″N 32°16′30″E
- Campus: Urban
- Website: suez.edu.eg

University rankings

Global – Overall
- QS World: 1201–1400 (2024)
- THE World: 1001–1200 (2024)
- USNWR Global: =807 (2023)

The Suez Canal University is an Egyptian public university serving the Suez Canal region. Its faculties are located in the three governorates of the Suez Canal Region (Port Said, Ismailia & Suez). It was established in 1974. It has 48 faculties (16 in Ismaïlia, 13 in Port Said, 10 in Suez and 9 in Arish) with a total number of students reaching 21,325.

== Specialties ==
The university has about 53 special units for research, education and community development.

The university also includes number of centers and units which offer different types of services which are:

=== Center of Open Education ===
The Center Of Open Education aims to provide an opportunity of continuing education for anyone who is holding a high school degree or a technical diploma and desires to raise/improve their educational and cultural level and obtain a bachelor's degree granted by the faculties which participate in center's program. The center also aims at granting various specializations to the bachelor's degree holders who want to have specialized degrees in the areas which are taught by the center.

=== Hospital ===
An accredited Suez Canal University Hospital provides evidence-based health care services that utilize top-notch technologies to serve the Egyptian community.

=== Faculty ===
The faculty aims to provide continuing professional development opportunities for faculty members and leaders at the university.

=== Technology Center ===
The Information and Communication Technology Center provides all the information about the university and its educational systems and the various details on programs of study at the various colleges.

== See also ==
- List of Islamic educational institutions
- Education in Egypt
- List of universities in Egypt
