= October 6 University =

First private university in Egypt

October 6 University (O6U) جامعة السادس من اكتوبر
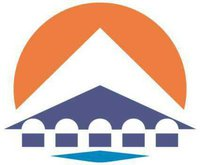
- Type: Private
- Established: 1996
- President: Prof. Gamal Samy
- Vice-president: Prof. Ali Abd El Aziz (Students Affairs and Postgraduate Studies)
- Students: 25000
- Location: Giza, 6th of October City, Egypt; 29.977°N 30.948°E
- Campus: Urban
- Website: o6u.edu.eg

October 6 University (O6U) is a private university located in Giza, 6th of October City, Egypt. It was established by the Republican Decree no. 243 in 1996.

O6U is in the 6th of October City, 32 km from downtown Cairo. The campus consists of four education buildings, the teaching hospital, and the hostel for female students, while the central library and male students hostel are 150 meters from the campus.

All the awarded degrees are accredited and validated by the Egyptian Supreme Council of Universities.

O6U is a member of the Association of Arab Universities since 1997 and the Association of African Universities.

== Faculties ==
1. Medicine (Accredited by NAQAAE)
2. Pharmacy (The first private faculty and the sixth Egyptian pharmaceutical faculty to be accredited by NAQAAE: 2014)
3. Dentistry (Accredited by NAQAAE)
4. Applied Medical Sciences (The Biomedical Engineering Department was the first in Egypt to be accredited by NAQAAE)
5. Engineering
6. Physical Therapy (Accredited by NAQAAE)
7. Information Systems & Computer Science (Accredited by NAQAAE)
8. Applied Arts (Accredited by NAQAAE)
9. Media & Mass Communication
10. Economics & Management
11. Languages & Translation (accredited by NAQAAE)
12. Education
13. Social Science
14. Tourism & Hotel Management (Accredited by NAQAAE)
15. Nursing

== Postgraduate studies ==
An academic cooperation agreement was signed between many government universities and October 6 University (O6U). It was endorsed by the supreme council of national and private universities on June 4, 2011, by which O6U is allowed to offer postgraduate programs in collaboration with Theses Universities and degrees will be granted by them.

== October 6 University Hospital ==
The hospital is built on a surface area of 45,000 square meters. It has a capacity of 360 beds, 20% out of them offer free-of-charge service for education purposes. Most of the hospital's capacity is made for its dental students, It serves the public community with totally free services done by their dental students and under the supervision of its facilities.

== Institutes ==
The university has many institutes of higher education under the name Culture & Science City.

The Culture and Science City has two campuses: the first is in 6 October City and the second is in Sheraton and distributed per the following locations:

6 October Campus

- Higher Institute of Engineering
- Higher Institute for Mass Media and Communication Techniques
- Higher Institute for Computer Science and Information Systems
- Higher Institute of Languages
- Higher Institute of Administrative Sciences
- Higher Institute of Economics and Environment
- Higher Institute for Social Work

Sheraton Campus

- Higher Institute for Optics Technology
- Egyptian Higher Institute for Tourism and Hotels
- Higher Institute for Languages (Sheraton Buildings)

== Library ==
Six October University Library (SOUL) is considered one of the largest, well–stocked university libraries in Egypt. SOUL is outside the university campus (150 m from it) and is designed to be an integrated and all–embracing cultural complex to support the instructional and research needs of university community and beyond. SOUL learning technology consists of the libraries, academic computing services, center for learning and teaching.

SOUL offers online and offline access to databases, e-books and imprint. It houses thousands of volumes, microfilms, digital collection, multimedia materials, and serial titles.

== Notable alumni ==
- Tamer Hosny, Egyptian singer and actor
- Mohamed M. Farid, politician

== See also ==
- List of universities in Egypt
- Education in Egypt
