= Beverly Hills Schools =

Group of private schools in Egypt

Beverly Hills Schools (BHS)

Location
- Beverly Hills, Sheikh Zayed City, Giza Governorate; Egypt; 30.0567°N 30.9474°E

Information
- School type: Private
- Established: 2003
- Founder: Mohamed Gahin
- School board: Mohamed Hemeda; Hesham Gahin
- Principal: Sven Sievert (German School)
- Classes: 1–12
- Language: German, English, Arabic, French
- Website: www.bhs-egypt.com

Beverly Hills Schools (BHS) is a group of private schools in Sheikh Zayed City, Giza Governorate, Egypt, near Cairo. It includes an American School, a British School, and a German school.

The German school, Deutsche Schule Beverly Hills Kairo is recognised as a German school abroad by the Central Agency for German Schools Abroad (ZfA). It serves Kindergarten though Oberstufe Grade 12.

American School Beverly Hills Cairo serves up to high school. It was chartered in 2007.

English School Beverly Hills Cairo or Beverly Hills English Language School includes up to secondary level 3.

== History ==
=== Deutsche Schule Beverly Hills Kairo (DSBHK) ===
The Deutsche Schule Beverly Hills Kairo, established in 2003 under the leadership of Dr. Mohamed Gahin and with the involvement of several visionary individuals, was founded with the primary aim of addressing the growing demand for German education in Cairo. The institution sought to complement the existing German schools in the city and, from its inception, prioritized the acquisition of recognized German educational qualifications. Immediate collaboration was initiated with the Central Agency for Schools Abroad (Zentralstelle für das Auslandsschulwesen, ZfA) in the Germany.

Within three years of its establishment, the school received its initial teaching support from Germany, facilitated by ZfA. In 2006, the Deutsche Schule Beverly Hills Kairo introduced the Deutsche Sprachdiplom (DSD) examinations, enhancing its academic offerings. Notably, 2008 marked the appointment of the school's first German-sourced principal, followed by the arrival of another German teacher in the subsequent year. In 2009, the Deutsche Schule Beverly Hills Kairo officially received recognition as a German international school.

In 2010, the school obtained approval from the Kultusministerkonferenz (KMK) to conduct secondary education (Sekundarstufe I) for grades 5 to 10, with plans to commence graduation examinations in the academic year 2012-2013. In 2011/12, a change in the academic calendar resulted in a reduced school year of 180 days and introduced new class schedules, leading to the school's recognition as an international institution in Egypt.

In 2013, the school's first cohort completed the secondary education program through Grade 10. Additionally, in May 2013, the International Baccalaureate Organization (IBO) granted authorization for the school to offer the IB Diploma Programme in Grades 11 and 12, making it one of approximately 40 German international schools to offer the IB program in a bilingual fashion (English and German), known as GIB. The inaugural GIB graduates received their diplomas in 2015.

In preparation for the Bund-Länder-Inspektion (BLI), an inspection conducted by the KMK and ZfA, the school diligently developed various educational documents and implemented new concepts in its curriculum. In late 2017, the Bund Länder Committee for Schoolwork Abroad (BLASchA) approved new curricula for all subjects in both primary and secondary education. Following an inspection visit by the BLI commission in March 2018, the school was awarded the "Exzellente Auslandsschule" (Excellent International School) quality seal, presented by the German Ambassador, Julius Georg Luy, in November 2018. Simultaneously, the school successfully completed a routine evaluation by the IBO in December 2018.

== See also ==
- Deutsche Evangelische Oberschule
- Deutsche Schule der Borromäerinnen Kairo
- Deutsche Schule der Borromäerinnen Alexandria
