= Dream Park (amusement park) =

Amusement park in Egypt

Coordinates: 29°58′03″N 31°03′36″E

Dream Park is an amusement park located on Oasis Road, in 6th of October City in the Giza Governorate, 8 km (5.0 mi) from the Pyramids of Giza. With an area of 150 acres (61 ha), it's one of the largest amusement parks in the Middle East. It was developed by Ahmed Bahgat. It opened in 1999 and was designed by the Canadian company Forrec, (designer of Universal Studios). Dream Park can accommodate 30,000 visitors daily and includes a wide range of attractions.

== Dreamland ==
Dream Park is part of the city of Dreamland, which consists of a commercial mall, Dream Cinema, golf courses, Pegasus Club, Equestrian Club, Hilton Dream Hotel, Helnan Hotel, and the Swiss Inn Hotel. The park is located on Oasis Road, in the city of 6th of October in Giza Governorate, 8 km from the Pyramids of Giza. It is bordered by the city of Al-Fardous, the tree district, the city of media production and the Mövenpick Hotel. It is close to Al-Ahram Gardens, Sheikh Zayed City, Cairo–Alexandria desert road and Smart Village.

The park consists of seven areas, with attractions for particular age groups, namely (Miramar, Plaza, Children, Movie, Ancient, New Children's Area, Techno Area), in addition to a group of different restaurants and shops.

=== Lawsuit ===
A trial is considering the handover of Dreamland's assets, including Dream Park, owned by Bahgat, to the Egyptian Real Estate Asset Management Company owned by the National Bank of Egypt and Banque Misr, in exchange for paying off debts due to it to the two banks.

== Flat Rides & Coasters ==
Dream Park contains a Vekoma SLC called "الأفعوانية" which in English translates to Rollercoaster.

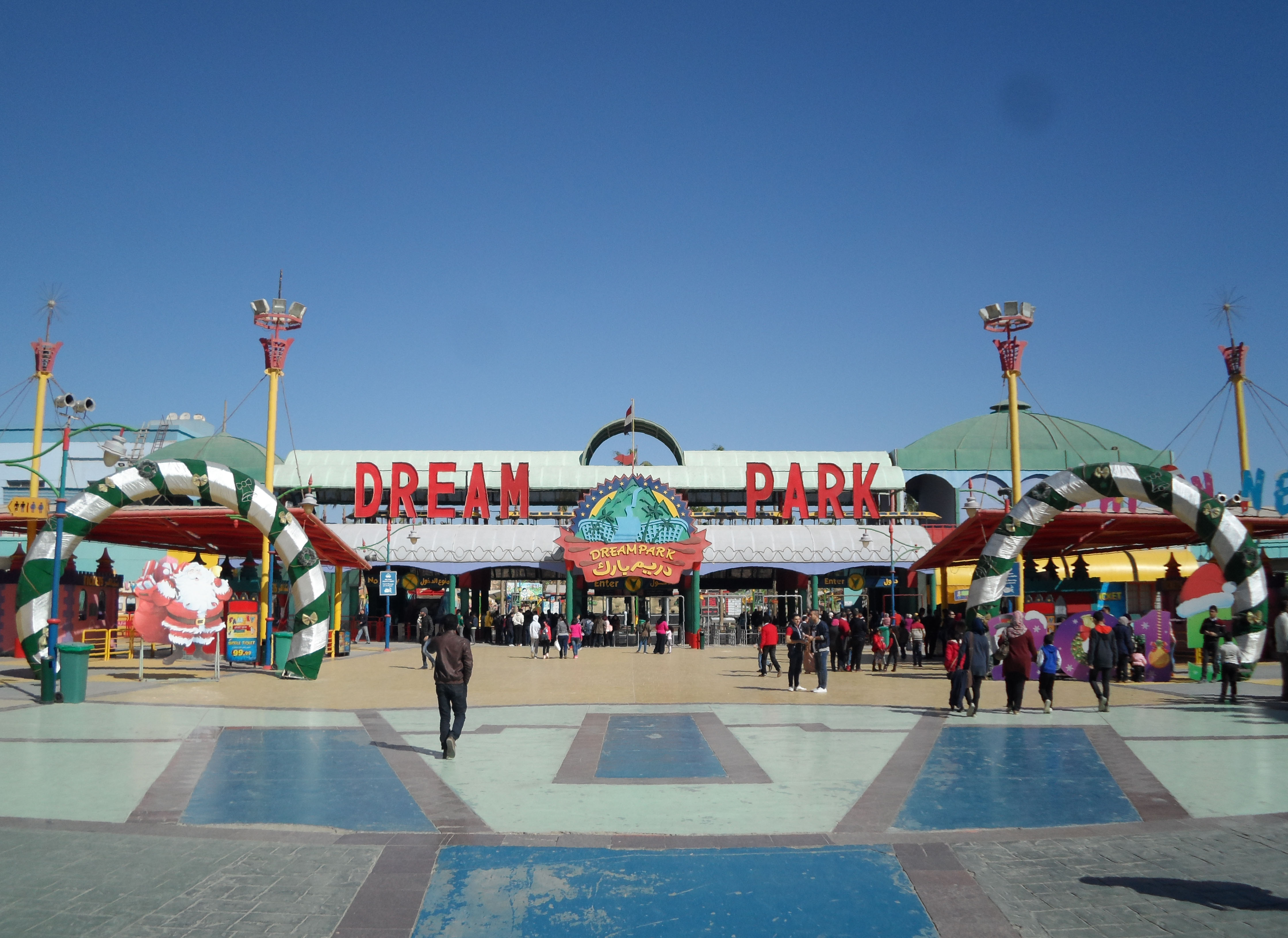
Dream Park Entrance

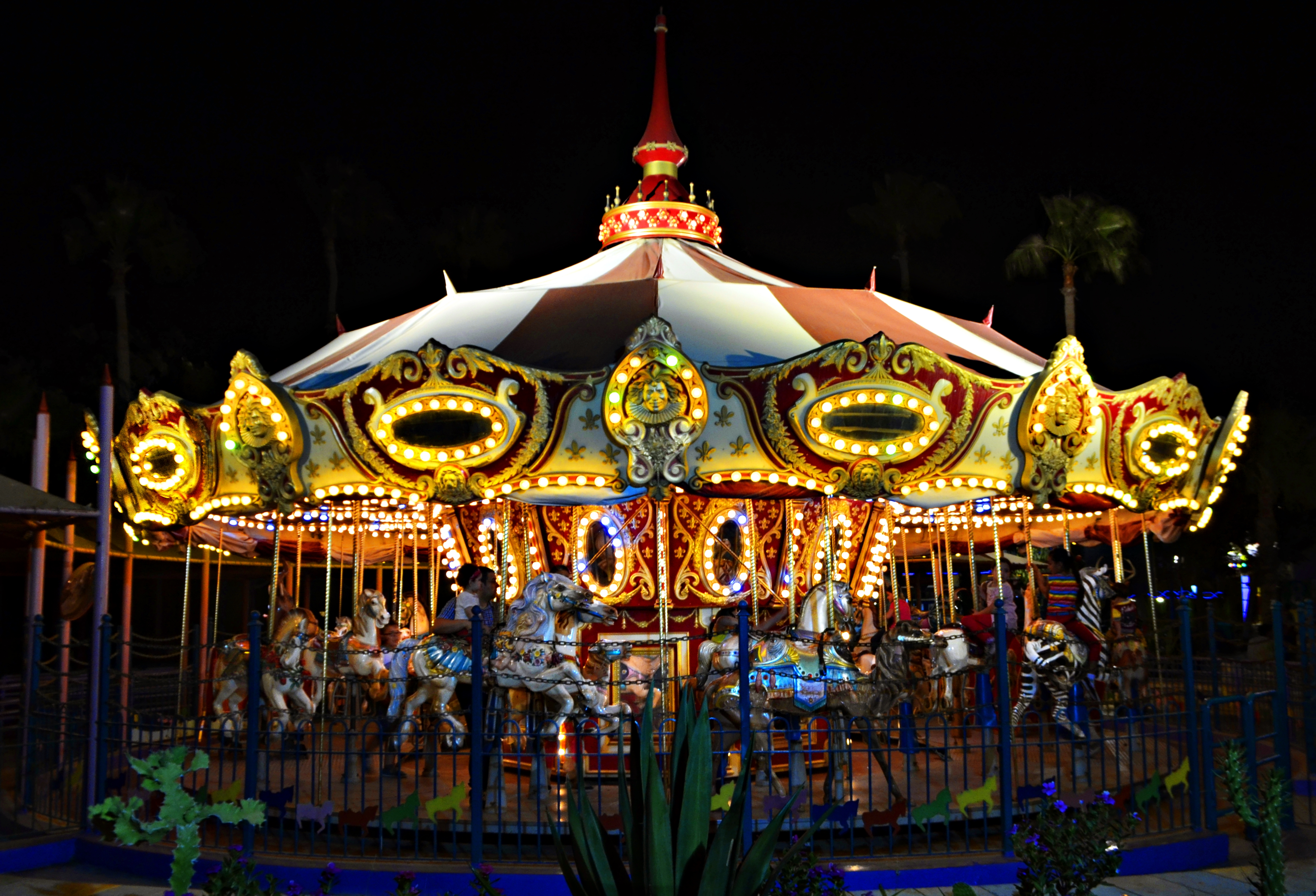
Merry-go-round

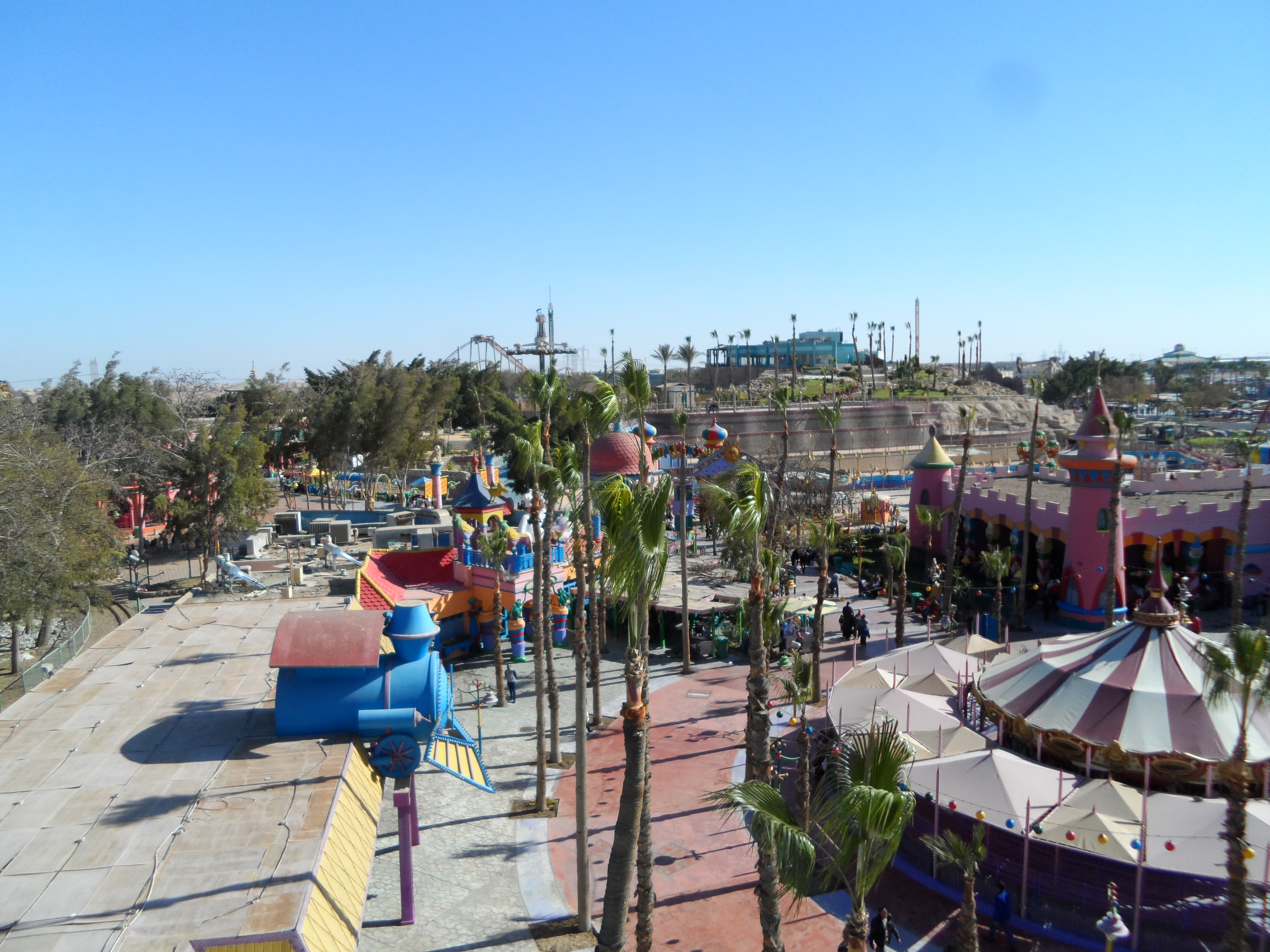
Rides inside the park

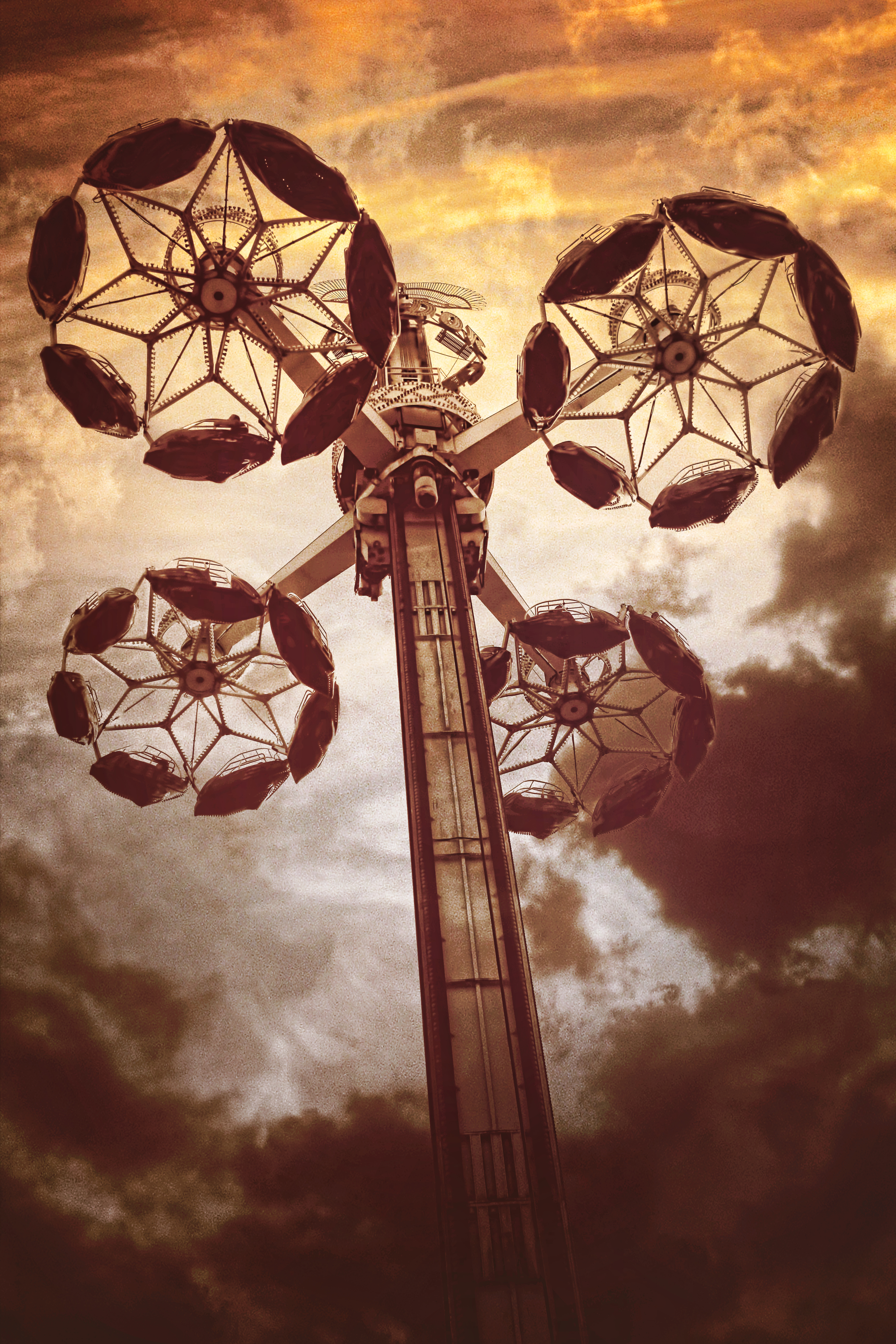
