= Shahinaz =

Shahinaz is a given name. Notable people with the name include:

- Shahinaz Gadalla, physician-scientist and cancer epidemiologist
- Shahinaz Gawish, Egyptian television presenter
