= 6th of October (city) =

6th of October السادس من أكتوبر سته اكتوبر Setta oktōbar
- City
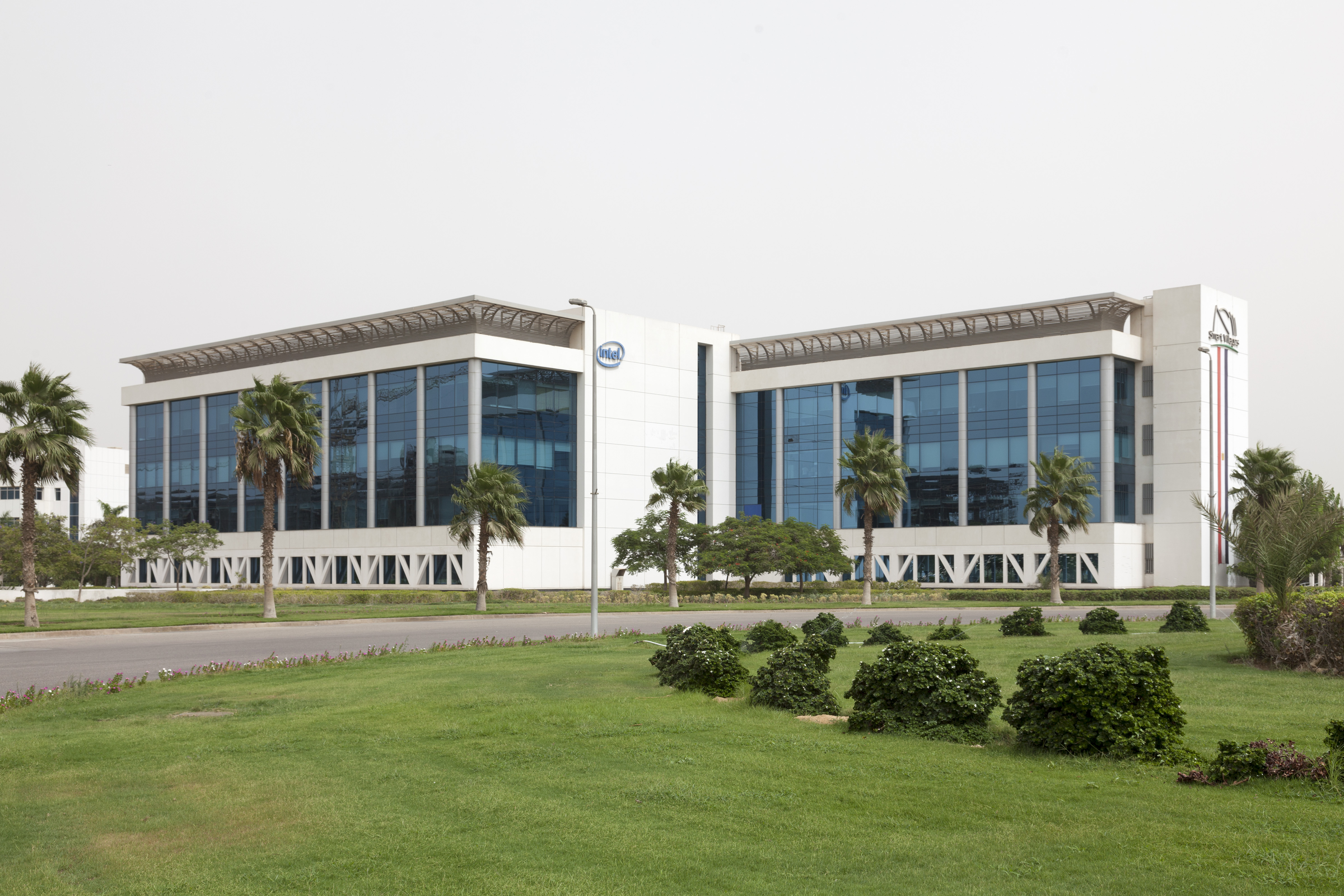
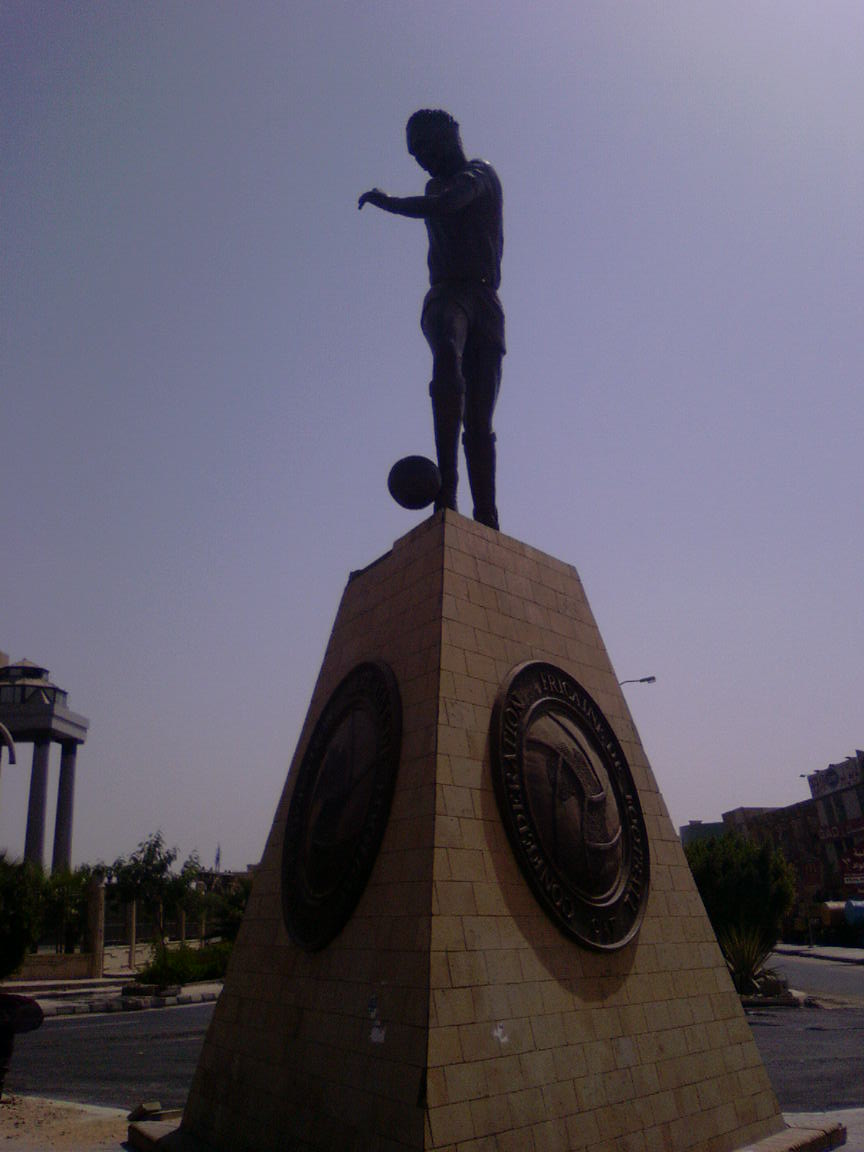
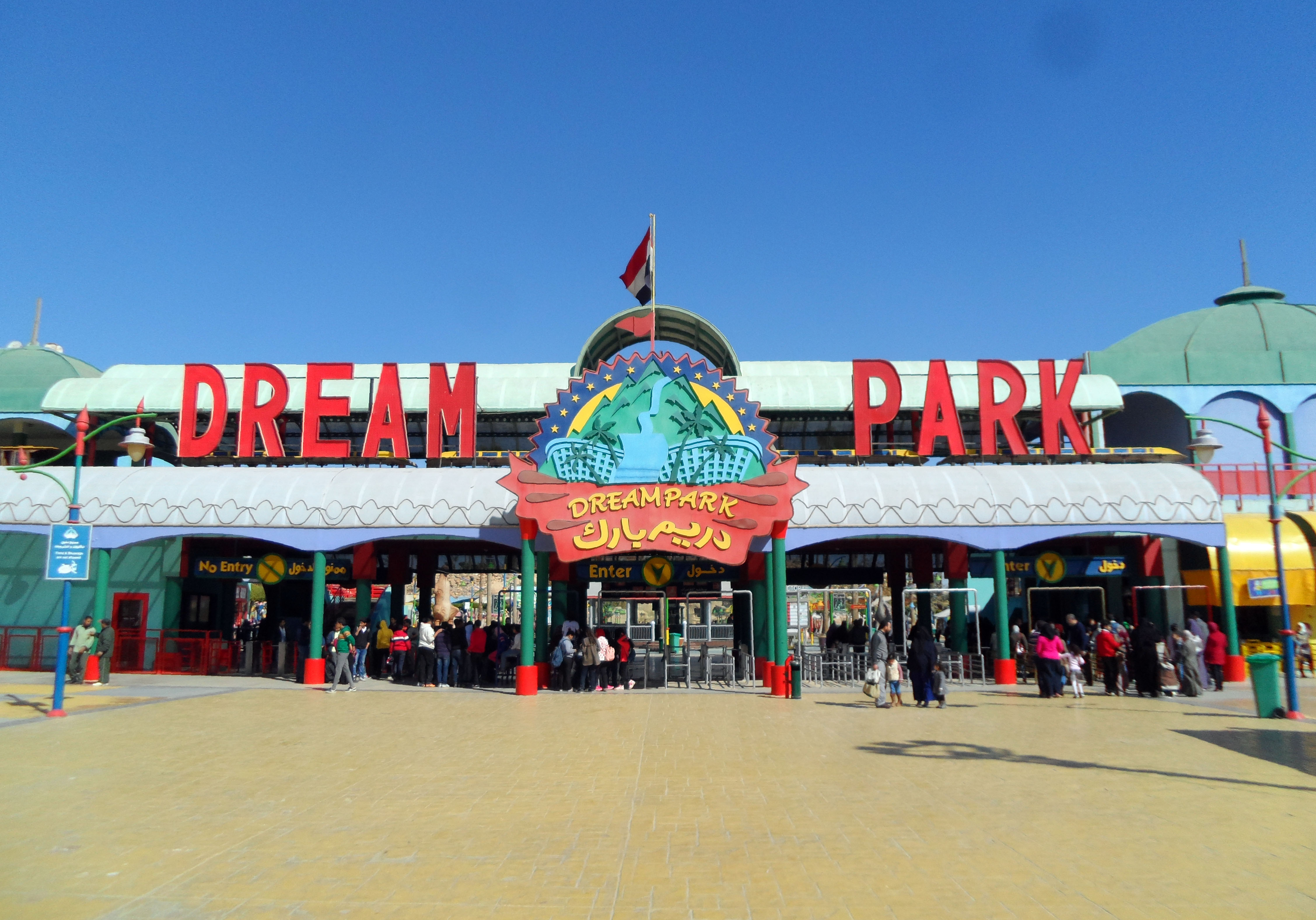
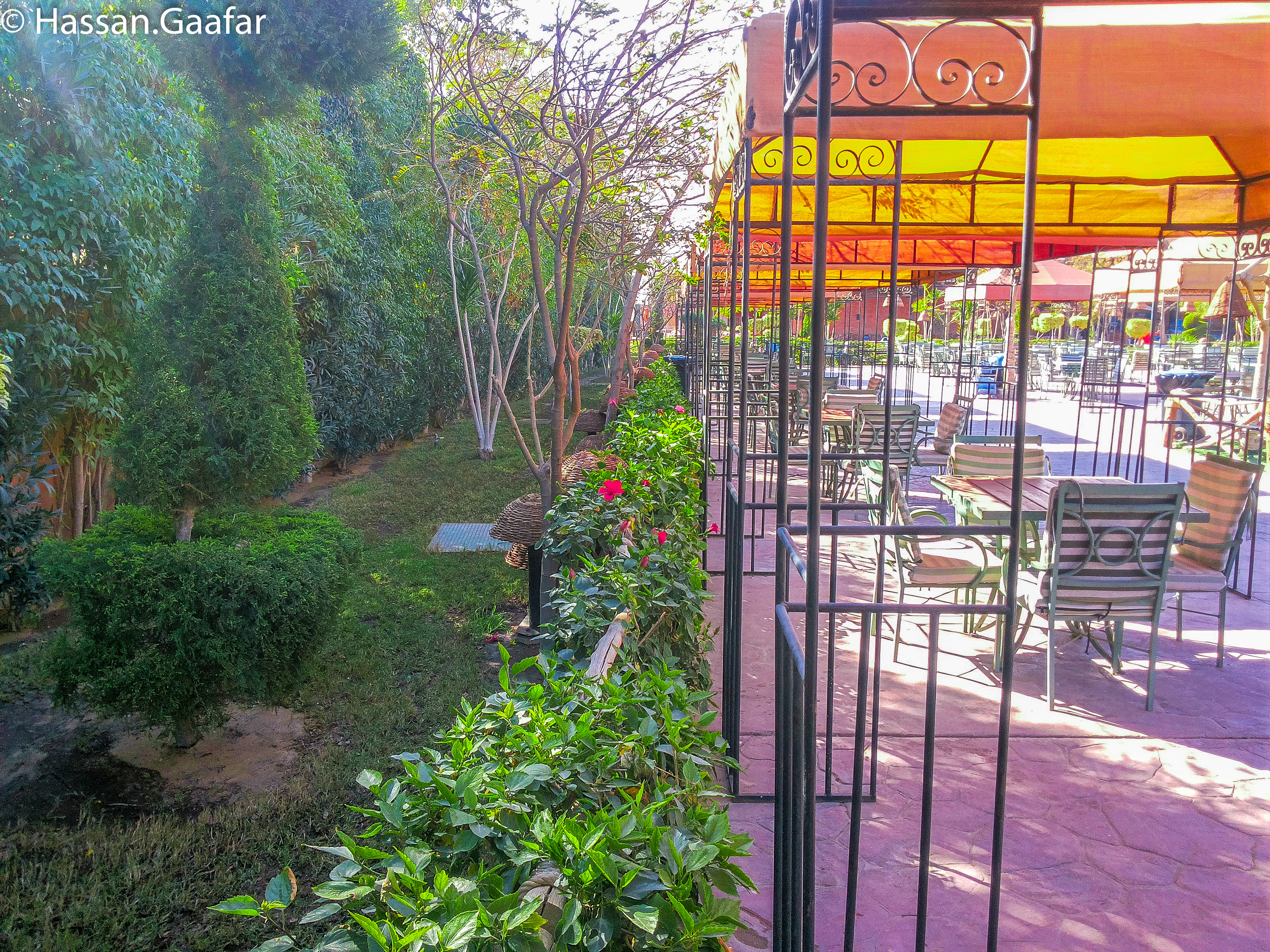
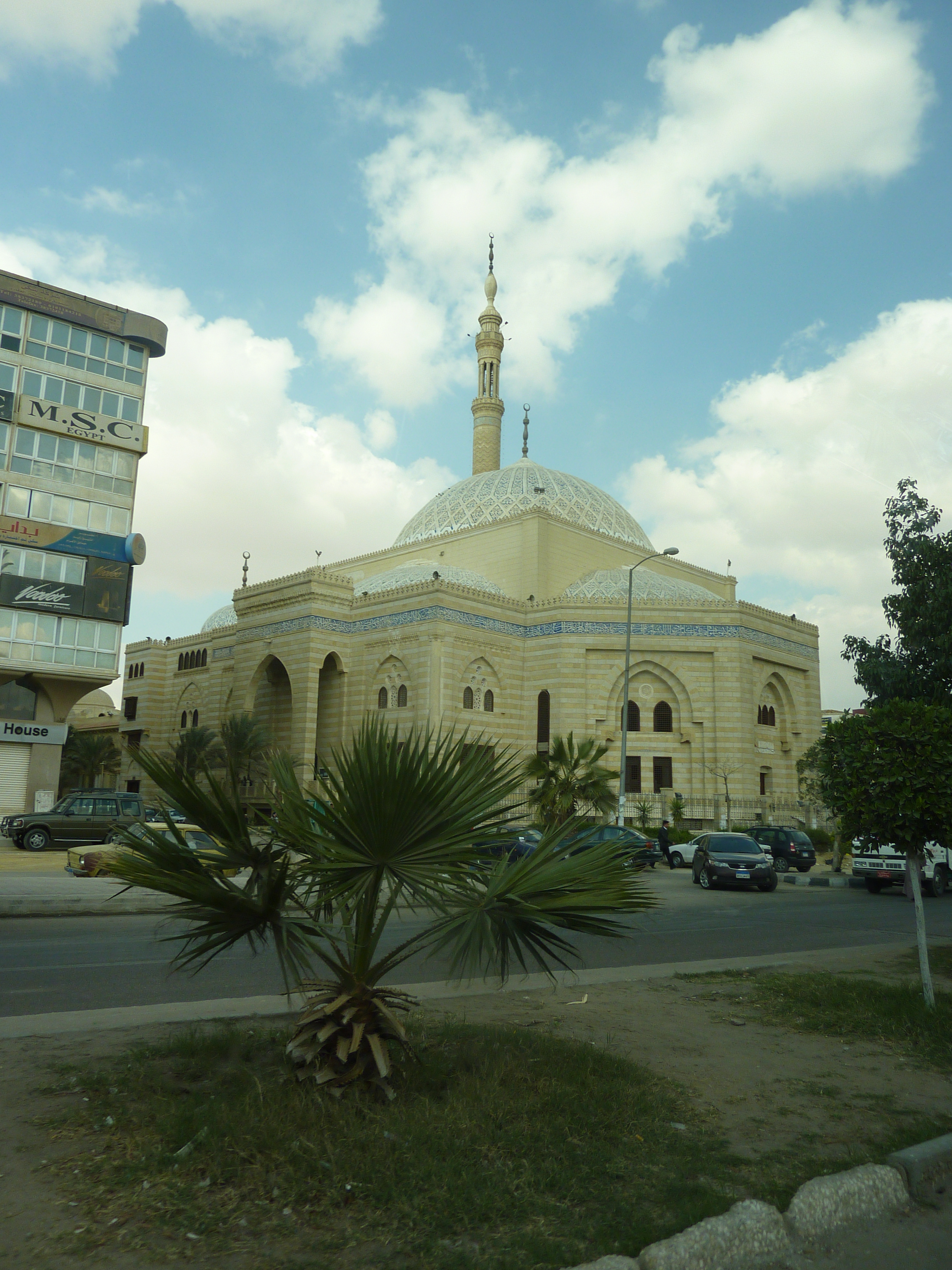
- Smart Village CAF HQ Dream Park Wadi Degla Hossary Mosque

- Location in Egypt
- Coordinates: 29°59′N 30°58′E
- Country: Egypt
- Governorate: Giza
- Metropolitan area: Greater Cairo
- Founded: 6 October 1979
- Named for: October War

Area
  - Total: 438 km^{2} (169 sq mi)

Population (2026)
  - Total: 2 000 000
  - Density: 0.0046/km^{2} (0.012/sq mi)
- Time zone: UTC+2 (EET)
  - Summer (DST): UTC+3 (EEST)

6th of October is a city in the Giza Governorate, Egypt. It is a satellite city, located adjacent to Giza, and is part of the Greater Cairo region. The city served as the capital of the now-defunct 6th of October Governorate, which was dissolved in 2011. 6th of October was the starting date of the operation which opened the Egyptian front of the 1973 October/Yom Kippur War, and is the date of Egypt's Armed Forces Day. Established as a new city in the desert, 6th of October hosts several local and international educational facilities.

== History ==
The settlement was established in 1979 by the 504th presidential decree of Egyptian President Anwar Sadat. It is 32 km (20 mi) from the center of Cairo and 17 km (11 mi) from the great pyramid of Giza. Despite having many unfinished or vacant buildings, the city has a total area of 482 km^{2} (119,000 acres) and is eventually expected to have six million residents.

It was announced as the capital of the 6th of October Governorate in April 2008. Following the governorate's dissolution in April 2011, in the wake of the Egyptian revolution, it was reincorporated into the Giza Governorate, to which it had originally belonged.

The city is named after the date of commencement for Operation Badr, the 6th of October 1973, which began the October War. The same date was chosen as Egypt's Armed Forces Day.

After the start of the Syrian civil war, many Syrian refugees fled to Egypt. Many of them settled in 6th of October City, which houses a significant Syrian community today.

== Climate ==
The Köppen-Geiger climate classification system classifies its climate as hot desert (BWh). Its climate is very similar to Giza and Cairo, owing to its proximity to them. That being said, some places in 6th of October are a bit colder and windier than central Cairo and Giza city at night for several reasons. This is mainly because buildings and infrastructure tend to be more spaced out, accompanied by more empty spaces, allowing for wind to pick up more easily than in the densely populated centres of Giza and Cairo. Additionally, the city was built in the desert which tends to be colder and drier than the damp humid areas closer to the Nile.

Climate data for 6th of October City
Month	Jan	Feb	Mar	Apr	May	Jun	Jul	Aug	Sep	Oct	Nov	Dec	Year
Mean daily maximum °C (°F)	18.4 (65.1)	20 (68)	23.1 (73.6)	27.6 (81.7)	31.7 (89.1)	34.1 (93.4)	34.4 (93.9)	34.1 (93.4)	31.9 (89.4)	29.6 (85.3)	24.8 (76.6)	20 (68)	27.5 (81.5)
Daily mean °C (°F)	12 (54)	13.1 (55.6)	15.9 (60.6)	19.5 (67.1)	23.5 (74.3)	26.3 (79.3)	27.2 (81.0)	26.9 (80.4)	24.9 (76.8)	22.6 (72.7)	18.5 (65.3)	13.8 (56.8)	20.4 (68.7)
Mean daily minimum °C (°F)	5.7 (42.3)	6.3 (43.3)	8.8 (47.8)	11.5 (52.7)	15.4 (59.7)	18.3 (64.9)	20 (68)	19.8 (67.6)	18 (64)	15.7 (60.3)	12.2 (54.0)	7.6 (45.7)	13.3 (55.9)
Average precipitation mm (inches)	5 (0.2)	5 (0.2)	3 (0.1)	2 (0.1)	0 (0)	0 (0)	0 (0)	0 (0)	0 (0)	1 (0.0)	3 (0.1)	6 (0.2)	25 (0.9)
Source: Climate-Data.org

== Demographics ==
=== Religious landmarks ===
==== Mosques ====
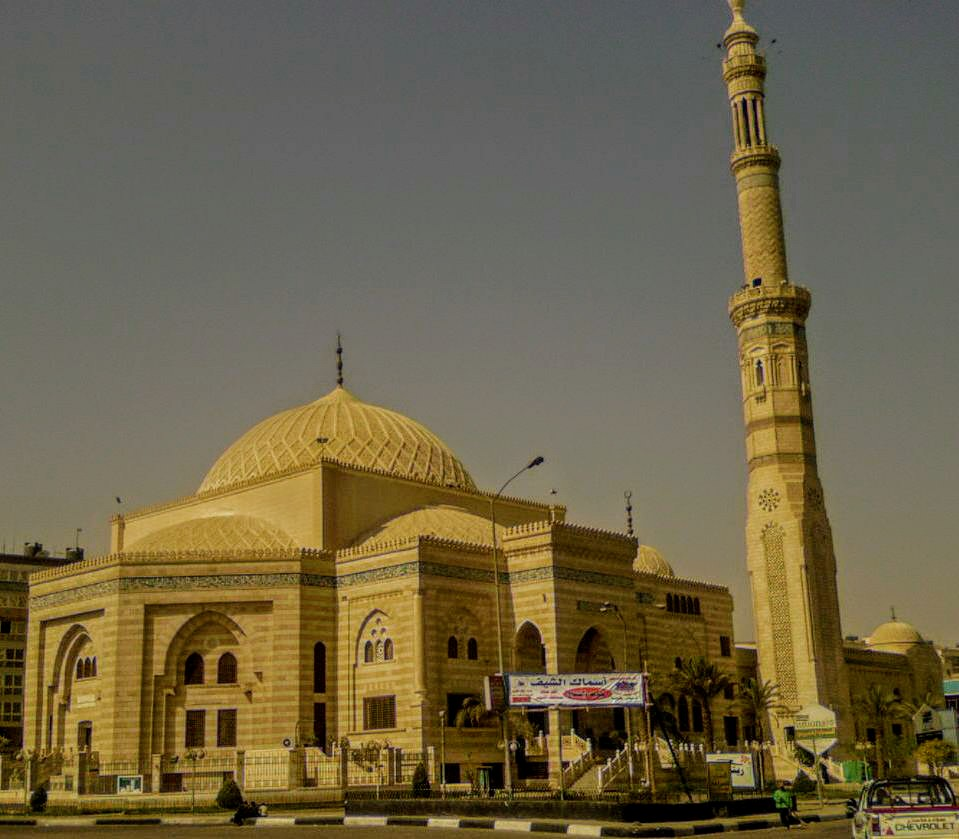
El Hosary Mosque

The city is served by many mosques, the largest being El Hosary Mosque on El Tahrir St. built in the honour of an eminent Egyptian Qari, Mahmoud Khalil Al-Hussary.

==== Churches ====
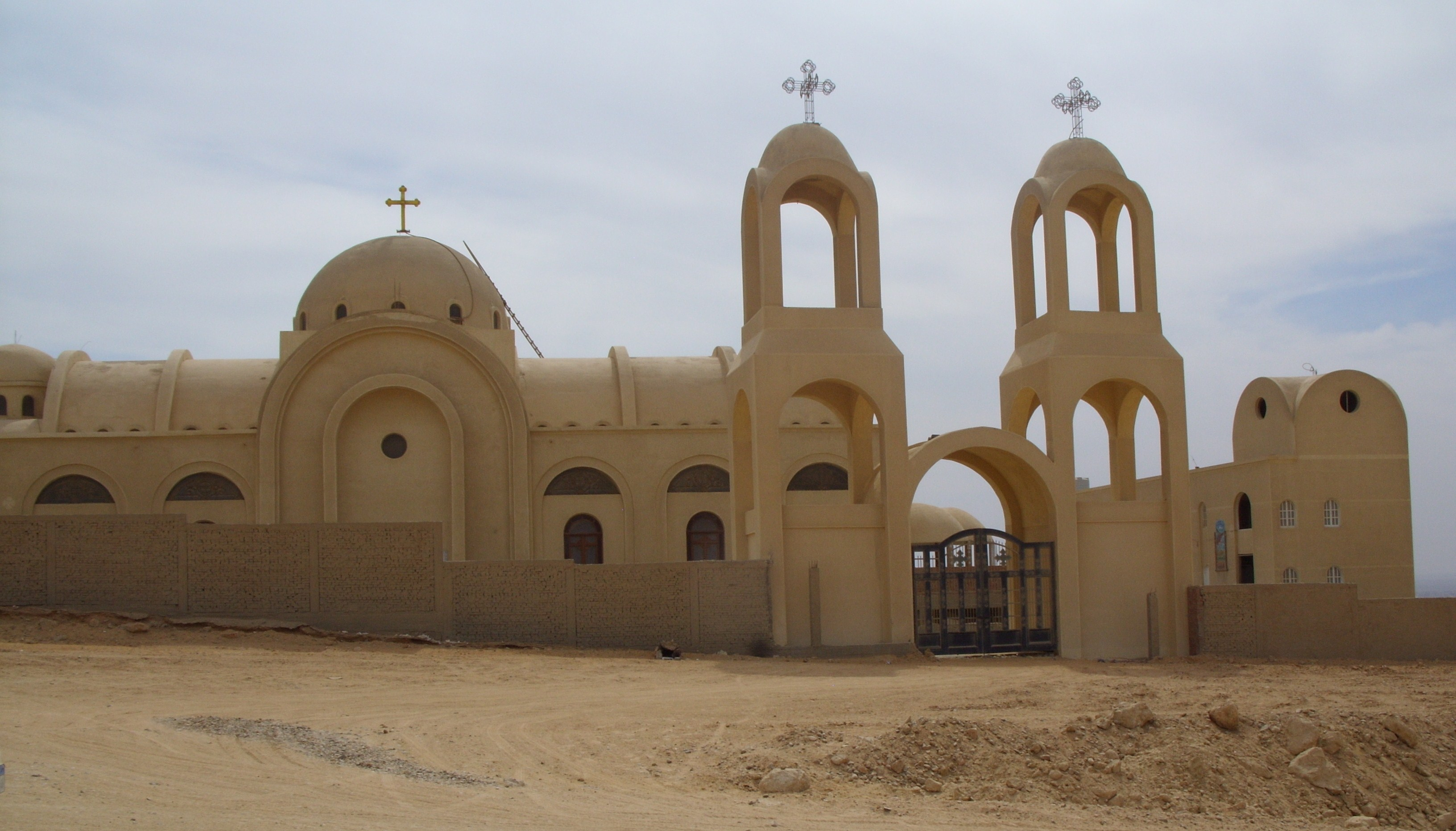
Evangelical Church

There are several churches in 6th of October city. The most famous of them belongs to the Evangelical megachurch of Nigeria, the Redeemed Christian Church of God.

== Economy ==
6th of October City has one of the largest centralised banking sectors, business districts and industrial zones of any city in Egypt, something upon which the entire city was founded. This area contains various banking branches, businesses, warehouses, corporate offices and more within a convenient location, and provides employment opportunities for people from within the city and other parts of Giza (as well as those commuting further from surrounding regions).

=== Services ===
Some of the largest businesses with locations in 6th of October City are:

- Bavarian Auto Group
- Egyptian German Automotive Company
- General Motors Egypt
- Egyptian Media Production City
- IKEA
- Shaer Consult Consultant Engineers
- Seoudi Group
- Stream Global Services
- Vodafone Egypt

=== Industry ===
6th of October Airport is used for the transport of products and materials to and from the city. The city also houses four industrial zones.

Major factories:

- IGA Egyptian-German Car Factory
- Suzuki Egypt
- Juhayna Food Industries
- Daewoo Motors Egypt
- Style Team Lighting
- Franke Kitchen Systems Egypt
- Pepsico Egypt
- Aller Aqua Factory

== Cityscape ==
=== Residential compounds ===
- Mountain View iCity October
- O West
- Kayan
- Keeva
- Badya
- Sun Capital
- Joulz
- Palm Parks
- Beta Residence
- Ashgar Residence
- Garden Lakes
- P/X
- Kingsway
- Mountain View 4
- Zayed Dunes
- Pyramid Hills
- October Plaza
- Beverly Hills
- Jirian Mountain View
- Hadaba
- Mountain view Giza Plateau
- Palm Hills October
- New Giza
- Grand Heights
- Mountain View Chillout Park

=== Headquarters ===
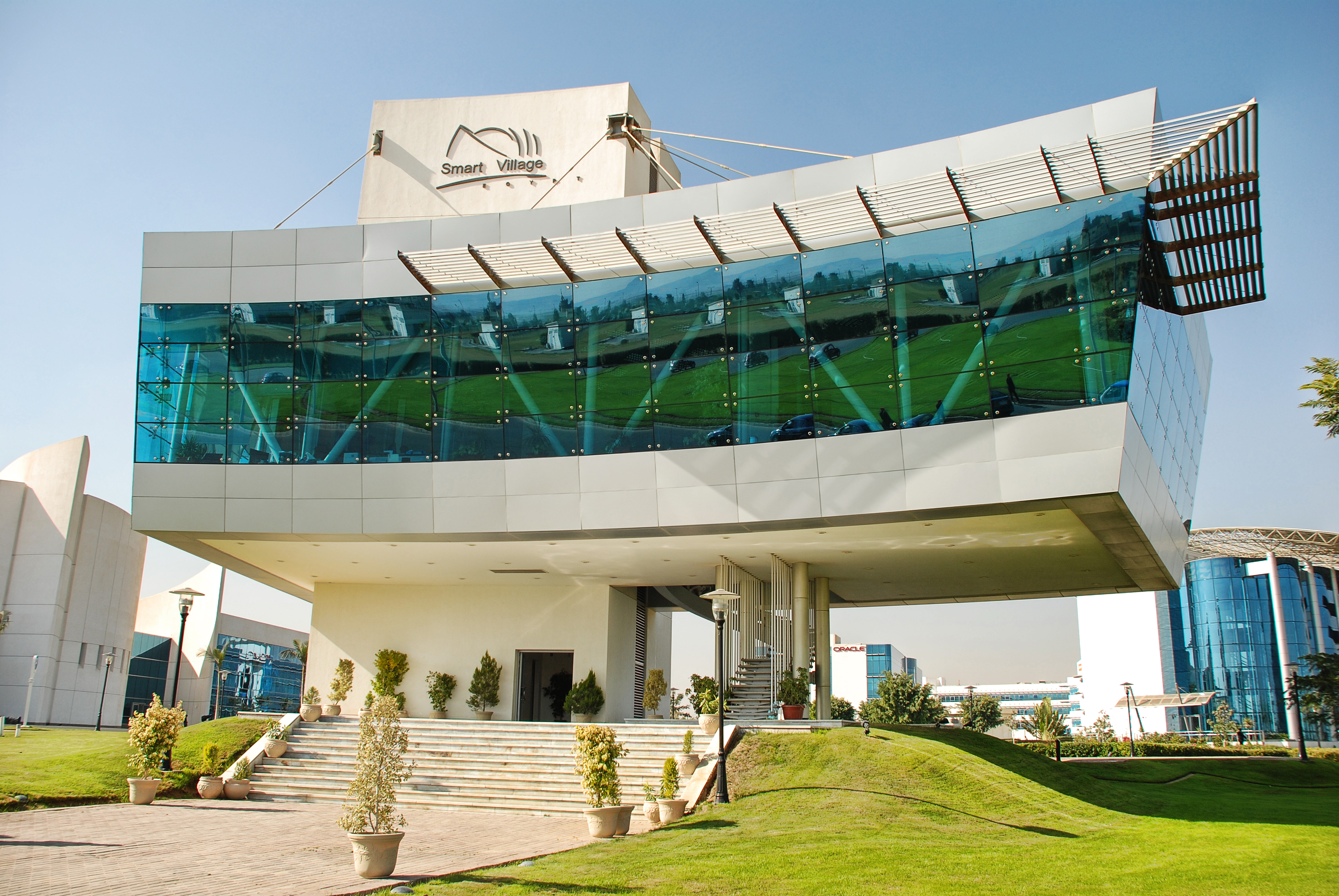
Smart Village Pavilion

6th of October is the headquarters of the Confederation of African Football and the Egyptian Football Association. It hosts Egypt's Smart Village, the technology park and regional hub for many companies in the IT and financial sectors.

The main office of the UNHCR in Egypt, in addition to its RSD office, is located in the city as well.

== Infrastructure ==
=== Education ===
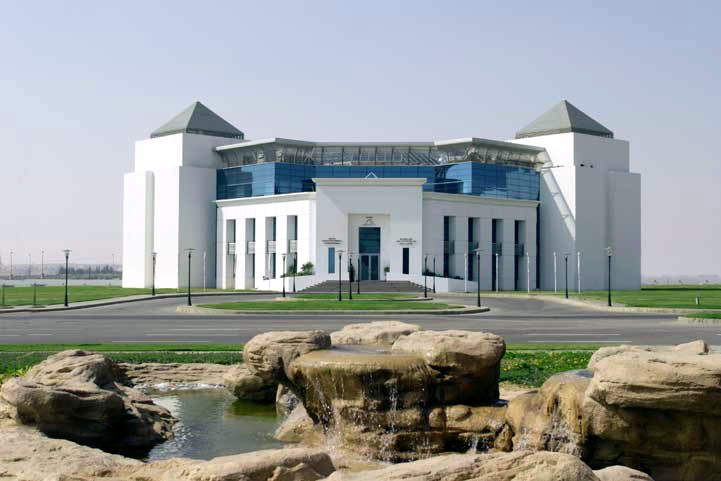
Center for Documentation of Cultural and Natural Heritage

6th of October City is home to a large student population, including many students from across Egypt as well as international students. The city attracts foreign students from Gulf Arab states, Jordan, Nigeria, Cameroon, Syria, Iraq, and Israel.

There are seven private universities in 6th of October City, including two private medical schools at Misr University for Science and Technology and October 6 University.

==== Universities and institutes ====
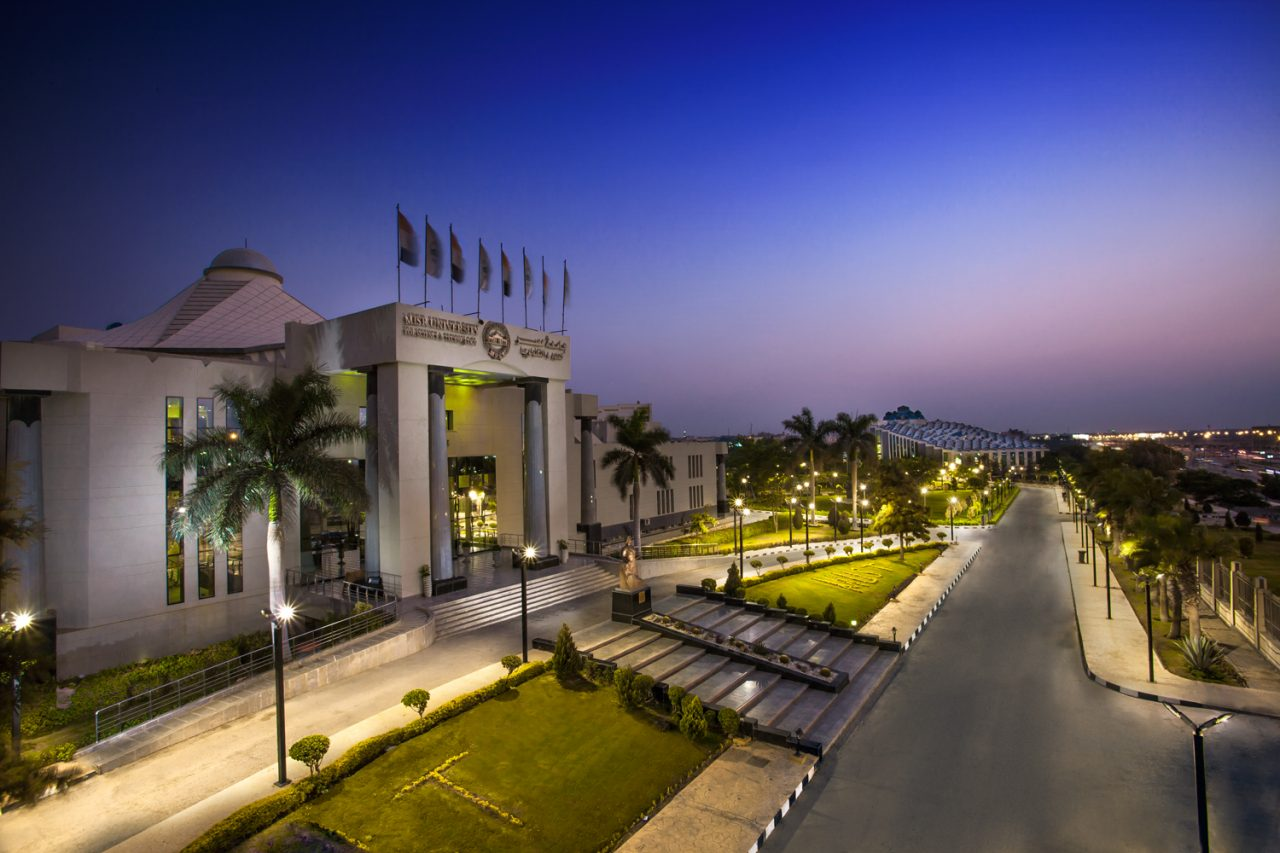
Misr University for Science and Technology (MUST)

- Ahram Canadian University (ACU)
- Akhbar El Youm Academy
- Culture & Science City
- Egyptian Aviation Academy (EAA)
- Higher Institute of Applied Arts
- Higher Institute for Architecture
- Higher Institute of Engineering
- Higher Institute of Science and Technology
- Higher Technological Institute
- Pyramids Higher Institute for Engineering and Technology
- Misr University for Science and Technology (MUST)
- Modern Sciences and Arts University (MSA)
- Nile University (NU)
- New Giza University (NGU)
- October 6 University (O6U)
- Zewail City of Science and Technology
- Arab Academy for Science, Technology, and Maritime Transport
- Information Technology Institute

==== Secondary schools and international schools ====
- American International School in Egypt West Campus – Sheikh Zayed City
- Beverly Hills Schools
- British International School in Cairo
- International School of Choueifat 6th of October City
- Heritage International School
- 6th of October Stem school
- City Language School
- Hossary-Azhari Language School
- Winchester International School
- Smart Village Schools
- Kipling School (British SVS Subdivision)
- Lycee Voltaire (French SVS Subdivision)

=== Healthcare ===
- Dar Al Fouad Hospital, the first accredited cardiac hospital in Africa and the Middle East
- Misr University for Science and Technology (Souad Kafafi Memorial) Hospital
- October 6 University Teaching Hospital
- El-Zohour Hospital (8th District)
- El- Safwa Hospital (1st District)

== See also ==
- Dreamland, Egypt
- Sheikh Zayed City
- Smart Village, Egypt
- Greater Cairo
- Haram City
- New Borg El Arab
- 10th of Ramadan (city)
- List of cities and towns in Egypt
