= American International School in Egypt =

Private school in Egypt

Coordinates: 30.0368°N 31.4209°E

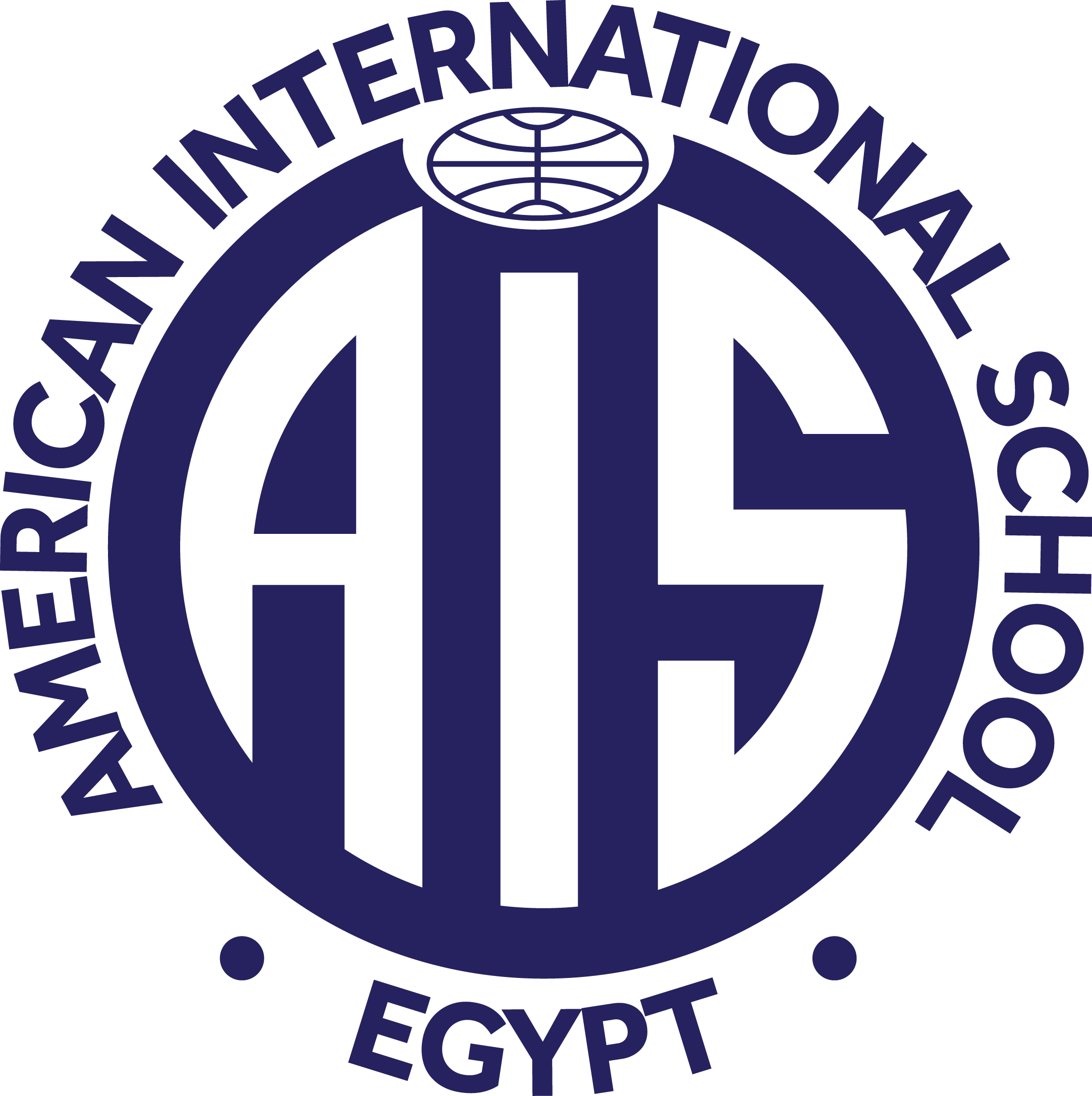
- Uptown Cairo, Mokattam, Cairo - Postal Code 11571 (Main Campus); Sheikh Zayed City (West Campus); Egypt

Information
- Type: Private
- Established: 1990 (Main Campus); 2010 (West Campus)
- CEEB code: 648295 (Main Campus); 648090 (West Campus)
- Director: Gerald Redd (Main Campus) Dr. Craig Ross (West Campus)
- Grades: K-12
- Enrollment: 1715 (Main Campus); 1222 (West Campus)
- Colors: Navy blue and white
- Website: www.aisegypt.com

The American International School in Egypt (AISE) is a co-educational college preparatory school in Greater Cairo. Its original East Campus is in New Cairo, Cairo, while its newer West Campus is in Sheikh Zayed City, 6th of October City.

The school opened to students in 1990. Nearly 1500 students from 41 countries attend school at the main campus. The school's environment is American. The student body is approximately made up of 80% Egyptian students, 10% American students, and the remaining 10% from other nationalities.

== Accreditation ==
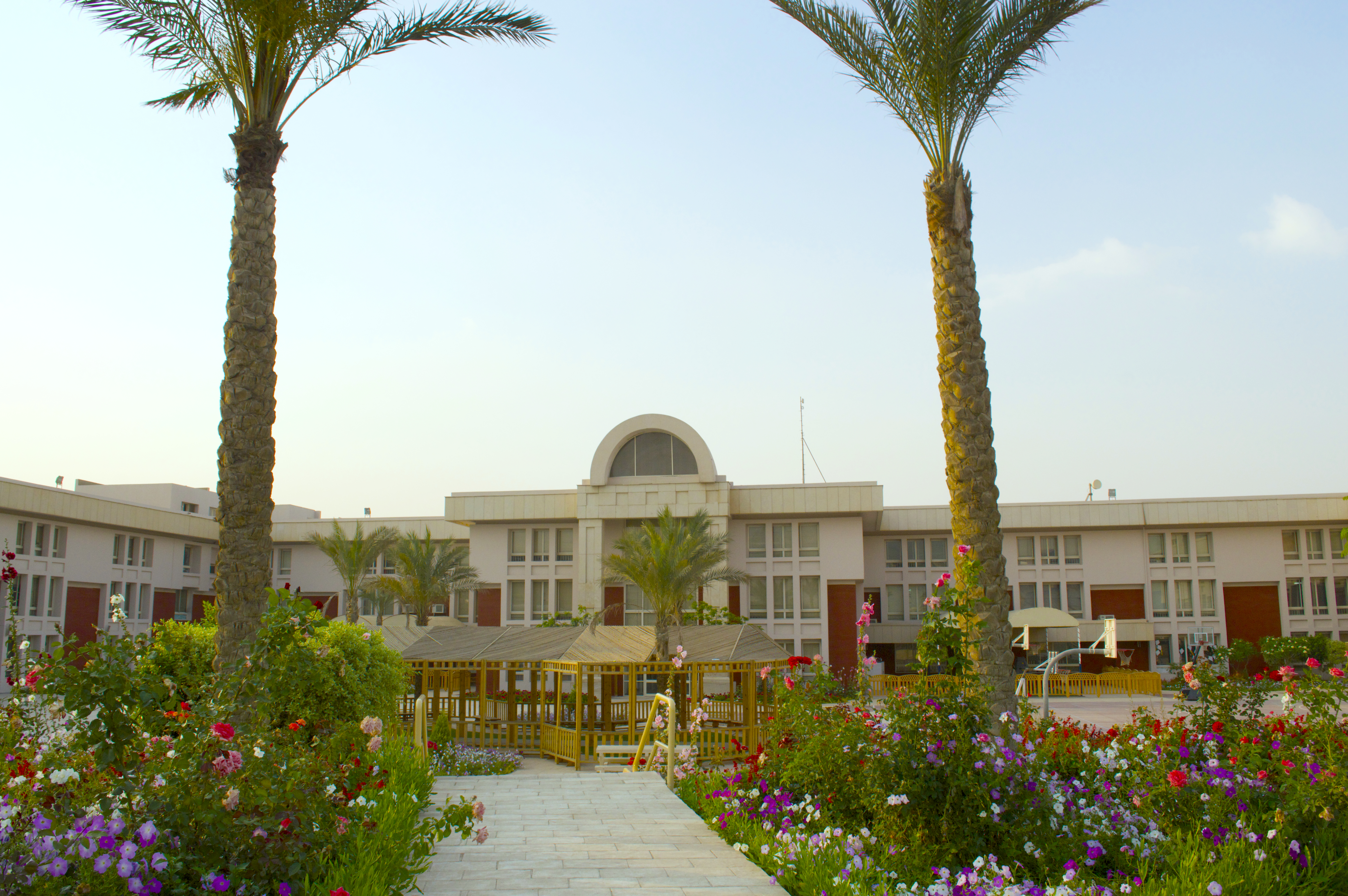
American International School in Egypt-Main campus

AIS Egypt is fully accredited by the Middle States Association of Colleges and Schools (MSA). AIS's American Diploma is not recognized by the Egyptian Ministry of Education, and so students from grade 1 and above start taking ministry subjects (one class Religious Studies/week, one class Egyptian Social Studies/week, and three classes of Arabic/week). When Arab students graduate, in addition to the American Diploma and the IB Diploma, they take the Egyptian General Certificate of Secondary Education. AISE is an IB World School, and is also accredited by the European Council of International Schools, the Council of International Schools, the Near East South Asia Council of Overseas Schools, the Mediterranean Association of International Schools, and the Associations for the Advancement of International Education.

== Curriculum ==
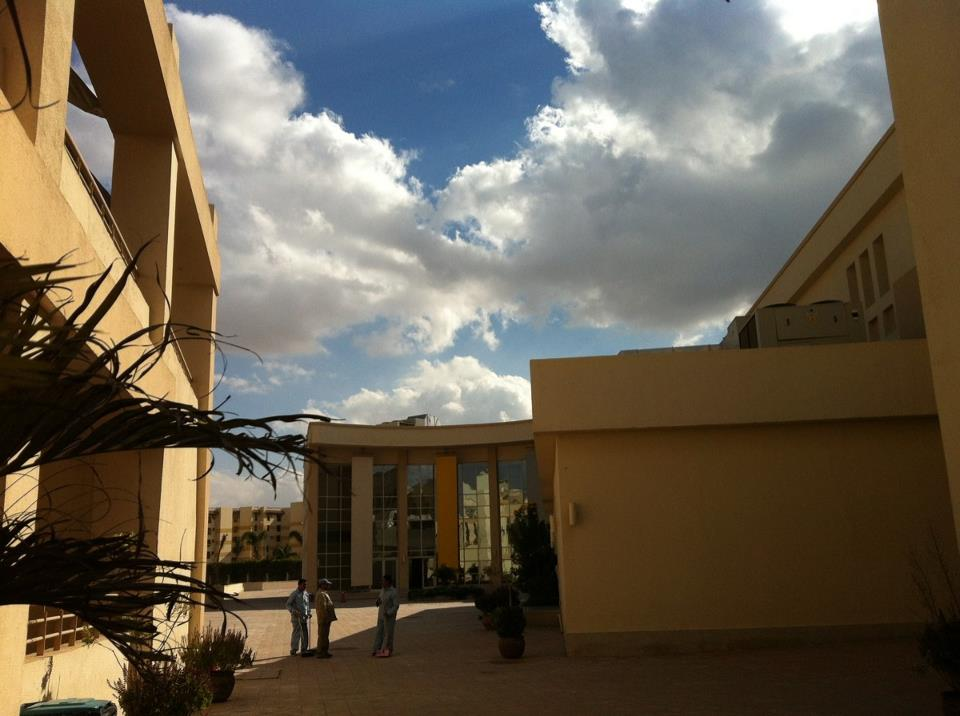
The interior of the West Campus

Qualified students in Grades 11 and 12 are offered the opportunity to earn a full International Baccalaureate Diploma or IB Certificates. AIS Egypt also offers AP subjects in high school years.

== Extracurricular activities ==
AIS is a member of OASIS Activities Conference (OAC),

== Notable students ==
- Omar Marmoush (born 1999) - Egyptian footballer
- Hamza Abdelkarim (born 2008) - Egyptian footballer
