= Haram City =

Haram City is a major affordable housing project being developed in Egypt by Orascom Development in 6th of October City. Construction of the project began in May 2007, and as of summer 2010 there are around 25,000 residents. By its scheduled completion in 2012, it will house 400,000 residents.

Haram City represents the largest private investment in affordable housing in Egypt. Resident incomes are limited to $320 a month for individuals and $450 for families. Despite these intentions, some residents have complained that the location is isolated and lacking in work opportunities. The development will include such features as schools, a hospital, and a shopping mall.
