= Shahinaz Gawish =

Egyptian TV presenter

- Born: Cairo, Egypt
- Known for: TV presenter

Shahinaz Gawish (Arabic: شاهيناز جاويش), is an Egyptian TV presenter. She is known as a former presenter of the TV show Sabah El Kheir Ya Masr (7 O'Clock) (Arabic: صباح الخير يا مصر) where she talked about news of the day. The TV show presents a variety of events. It is comprehensive for all conditions in Egypt, as it has many sections, including news, sports, tourism, agriculture, and weather.

== Early life ==
Shahinaz obtained a bachelor's degree in mass communication, radio and television department, from Misr University for Science and Technology, She also took the 36th Military Media Course from Nasser Military Academy.

== Career ==
Shahinaz presented several programs on Al Oula, the national Egyptian channel owned by ERTU, She also presented her own program Sabah El Kheir Ya Masr from 2012 until 2017, which was shown on Al Oula, and presented the new version of it from 2018 to 2020 as the main presenter of the program, in conjunction with TV presenter Tamer Shaltout, on weekdays. She was chosen by Minister Osama Heikal, the former Minister of Ministry of Information, to develop the program's format, and she is now presenting the TV show Sabahna Masry (Arabic: صباحنا مصري)

She joined the Egyptian National Media Authority in 2009 and presented the weather and sports bulletin for years.

She also presented a series of conferences attended by ministers, officials and elites from the Egyptian state, including the African Food and Nutritional Conference in the presence of Prime Minister Dr. Mostafa Madbouly.

== TV programs ==
- Presenter of the news and weather bulletin on Al Oula Egypt channel
- Presenter of the TV show Ala El-Bahr (Arabic: على البحر)
- Presenter of the TV show Aqsa Soraa (Arabic: أقصى سرعة)
- Presenter of the TV show Saharaat El-Eid (Arabic: سهرات العيد)
- Presenter of the TV show Flash (Arabic: فلاش) on Nile Drama Channel
- Presenter of the TV show Kalam Elyoum (Arabic: كلام اليوم)
- Presenter of the TV show Sabah El Kheir Ya Masr (Arabic: صباح الخير يا مصر) from 2012 to 2017
- Presenter of the TV show Sabah El Kheir Ya Masr (Arabic: صباح الخير يا مصر) after developing the program's format from 2018 to 2020
- Presenter of the TV show Misaha lilra'aa (Arabic: مساحه للرأى)
- Presenter of the TV show Sabahna Masry (Arabic: صباحنا مصري)
