= Mohamed M. Farid =

Egyptian politician (born 1982)

- محمد فريد
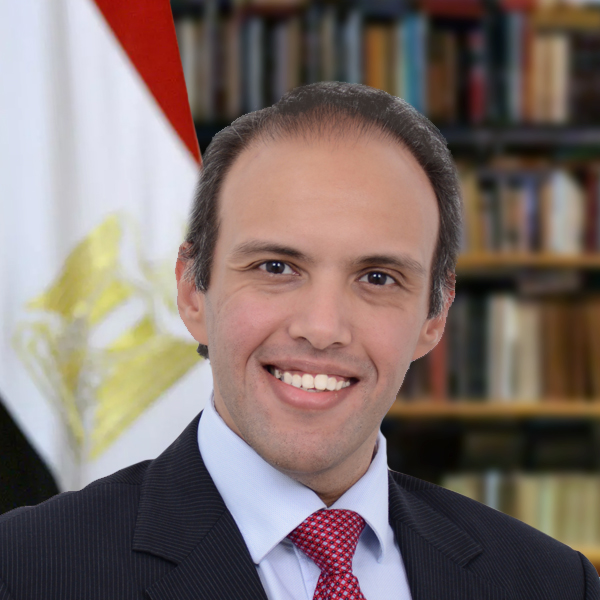
- Farid in 2020.

Member of Parliament
- In office 2020–2026
- Parliamentary group: Reform and Development Party

Personal details
- Born: Mohamed Magdy Farid; 8 August 1982 (age 43)
- Education: Industrial Engineering

Mohamed Magdy Farid (Arabic: محمد مجدي فريد), commonly known as Mohamed Farid, (born 18 August 1982 in Cairo) is an Egyptian Classic Liberal politician and a Member of the Egyptian House of Representatives representing the Reform and Development Party. He currently serves as the Secretary of the Human Rights Committee in the House of Representatives.

He previously served as a member of the Egyptian Senate and held the position of Deputy Chair of the Committee on Social Solidarity and Human Rights from 2020 to 2025. He is also a member of the Coordination of Youth Parties and Politicians.

== Education ==
Farid holds a bachelor's degree in industrial and management engineering from October 6 University, and a master's degree in Sustainable development Planning with a specialization in Economic Development from the Egyptian National Planning Institute. He holds certificates in leadership, management and capacity building. Farid also holds a DBA in financial management from the Arab Academy for Management, Banking and Financial Sciences.

== Political work ==
Farid was a founding member of the Free Egyptians Party and was included in the party work from membership in the secretariats of training, education and foreign relations through membership of the Political Bureau, and the last position he held was the secretary of the Republic's Youth and vice president of the Economic Committee before his resignation in early 2017. He participated in the economic committee of the National Salvation Front in Egypt. He was a member of the Executive Office of the Arab Youth Alliance, A member of the Executive Office of the Egyptian and Danish Parties Network, A member of the Coordination of Youth Parties and Politicians He is also Founding member of the liberal club in Cairo.

He participated in many international and regional conferences and events.

== Syndication ==
Farid is a member of the Mechanical Engineering Division from 2014, A member of the Supreme Council of the Egyptian Engineers Syndicate for the two sessions (2014–2016) and (2020–2022)

He was a member of the Investment and Finance Committees of the General Syndicate of Engineers from 2014 to 2016.

== Representative work ==
Farid was appointed to the Egyptian Senate by decision of President of Egypt Abdel Fattah el-Sisi on 16 October 2020. He took the oath of office for Senate membership on Sunday, 18 October 2020.

He was elected as a member of the Egyptian House of Representatives through the National List for Egypt, representing the Reform and Development Party, for the 2026–2031 parliamentary term.

On 14 October 2025, he was elected Secretary of the Human Rights Committee in the House of Representatives.
