= Deutsche Schule der Borromäerinnen Alexandria =

German School of Borromean Sisters Alexandria
- Deutsche Schule der Borromäerinnen Alexandria المدرسة الألمانية للقديس سان شارل بورومي بالإسكندرية
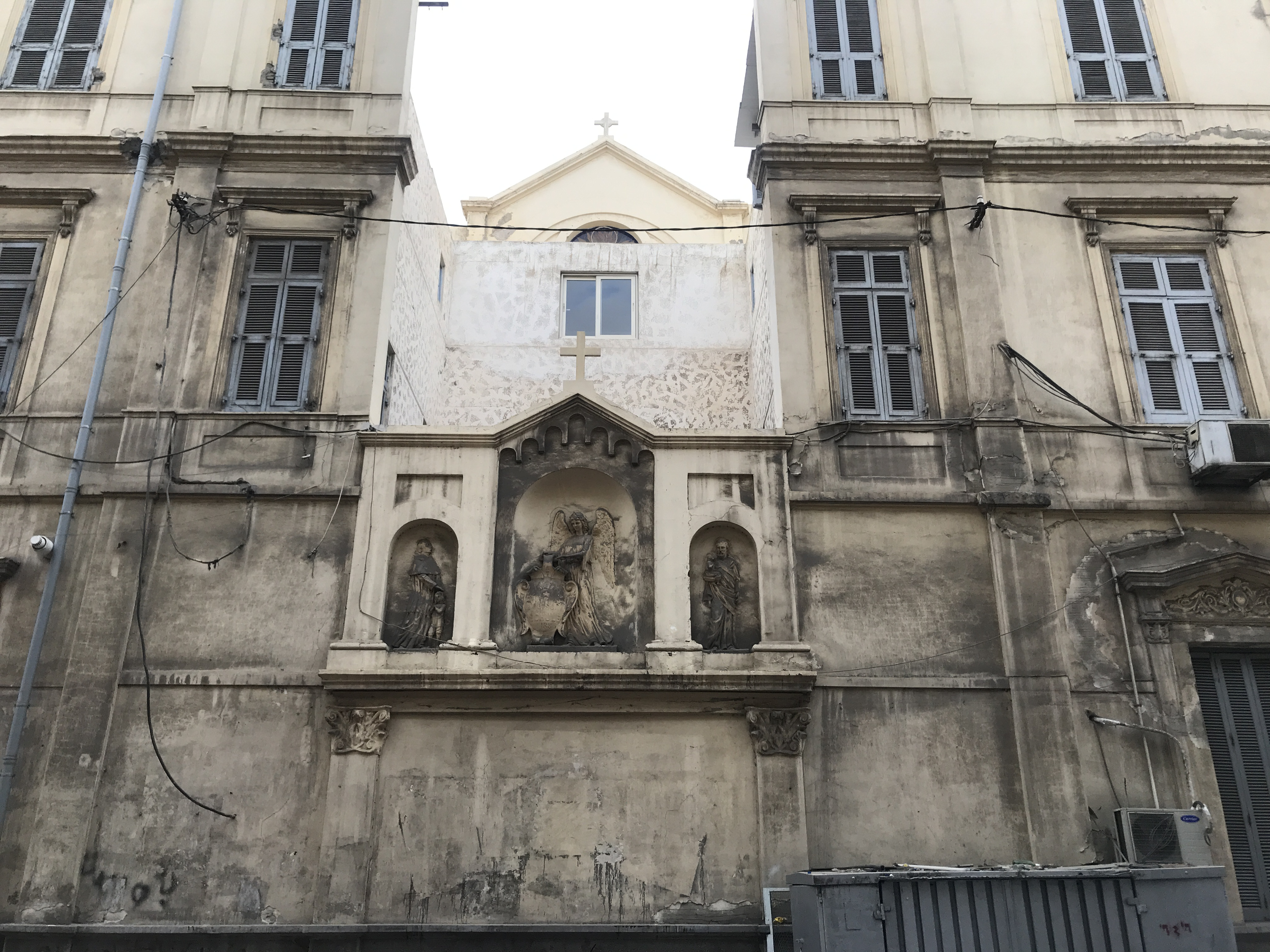

Information
- Established: 1884
- Gender: Female
- Website: https://dsb-alexandria.de/

Deutsche Schule der Borromäerinnen Alexandria (DSBA; Arabic: المدرسة الألمانية للقديس سان شارل بورومي بالإسكندرية) is a German-Egyptian school of encounter (German: Begegnungsschule), which is supported by the Federal Office of Administration in Cologne, both in personnel and funding terms. It is mainly attended by Egyptian female pupils. The school is run by the Sisters of Mercy of St. Charles Borromeo, based out of Grafschaft Abbey.

It was recognised as a German school abroad by the Central Agency for German Schools Abroad (ZfA).

== History ==
The Deutsche Schule der Borromäerinnen Alexandria was founded in 1884 and was initially an educational institution for German and Austrian children whose fathers were employed in the construction of the port of Alexandria. With the enlargement of the spectrum of pupils, a curriculum based on the model of the so-called higher school for daughters (dt. Höhere Töchterschule) was introduced in 1894.

After the expulsion of the German sisters in the First World War, they returned in 1922 to Alexandria to work again. In 1911, a commercial class was launched where the students learned accounts, shorthand, typewriting, and deepened their skills in foreign languages. In 1924, the first German teacher, appointed by the Foreign Office, undertook their service at the school. The number of German teachers increased alongside the growing student population.

After World War II, in 1946, Arabic became an official language taught at school. The first German secondary school leaving examination after grade 10 was conducted in 1958. In 1964, the first candidates registered for the Egyptian Thanaweya Amma school-leaving examination.

== See also ==
- Deutsche Schule der Borromäerinnen Kairo
