= Egyptian German Automotive Company =

Egyptian German Automotive Company الشركة المصرية الألمانية للسيارات
- Industry: Automotive industry
- Founded: 1996
- Founder: Jürgen Erich Schrempp; Samy Saad
- Headquarters: 6th of October City, Giza, Egypt
- Area served: Egypt, Europe, MENA, Africa, China
- Key people: Dr. Ahmed Fikry Abdel Wahab (Managing Director)
- Products: Automobiles
- Website: www.egasae.com

The Egyptian German Automotive Company (EGA) is an Egyptian car assembler who is located in the 6th of October City in Cairo. It was founded by engineer Samy Saad and the former Daimler-Benz CEO Jürgen Erich Schrempp as a joint venture to assemble vehicles of the Mercedes-Benz brand. The management of the 1996 founded firm is assumed by the Daimler AG who has given it to Markus Schäfer.

As of the mid-2020s, the Egyptian German Automotive Company has transitioned from its earlier focus on Mercedes-Benz assembly into a multi-partner manufacturing model aligned with Egypt’s broader automotive localisation strategy. The company’s operations are centred at its facility in Sixth of October City, which has an estimated production capacity of approximately 16,000 vehicles annually.

EGA currently assembles vehicles for multiple international manufacturers. Production includes luxury passenger cars under the Mercedes-Benz marque, with output of approximately 1,200 units annually, alongside newer production lines for the EXEED brand, where output is targeted to reach around 3,000 vehicles per year. The introduction of EXEED production in 2024 marked a strategic diversification into new partnerships and was aligned with Egypt’s policy to increase local content and expand exports to regional markets.

The company has also outlined plans to expand its manufacturing base through the addition of a new production line intended to produce up to 11,800 vehicles annually for an undisclosed international automotive partner. This expansion reflects a broader shift toward contract manufacturing and platform sharing, allowing EGA to utilise excess capacity while supporting new entrants into the Egyptian market.

In parallel, EGA has been identified as a key partner in planned localisation initiatives involving the Volkswagen Group. Under a multi-phase strategy announced in 2025, Volkswagen intends to begin manufacturing vehicles in Egypt through contract production at EGA’s facilities before establishing a dedicated factory in the East Port Said industrial zone. This arrangement positions EGA as an interim production hub for both conventional and potentially electric vehicles, supporting Egypt’s national Automotive Industry Development Programme.

Future plans for EGA also emphasise increasing the proportion of locally sourced components and expanding export capacity, particularly to North African and regional markets. Government-backed initiatives aim to raise localisation levels, enhance supplier networks, and develop technical expertise, with EGA expected to play a central role in these efforts as Egypt seeks to position itself as a regional automotive manufacturing hub.

== Brake disc machining ==
The brake discs machining plant started operation in 2002, basically covering the local content requirements for locally assembled vehicles, as well as minor spare parts supply to Daimler AG in Germany. In 2010, the plant expanded its capacity to 900,000 units annually, supplying Daimler AG with spare parts for a wide range of brake discs, covering recent passenger car models, historical classics and modern commercial vehicles. Export of brake discs has been ongoing since then to Daimler AG warehouses in Germersheim, Germany, as well as commercial vehicles unit in Kassel, Germany. A product development and validation facility (dynamometer) has been amended to the plant.

In 2014, the company was validated as VW Group supplier.

== Partner companies ==
EGA is partially owned by National Automotive Company (NATCO), a major player in the Egyptian automotive market. EGA is a 25% shareholder in a newly-found Grey Cast Iron foundry; Egyptian Kuwaiti Foundry (EKF), which is located nearby, and was established mainly to manufacture raw brake discs and drums for local and global markets.
