= Pyramids Higher Institute for Engineering and Technology =

Academic foundation in Giza, Egypt

- معهد الأهرامات العالي للهندسة والتكنولوجيا
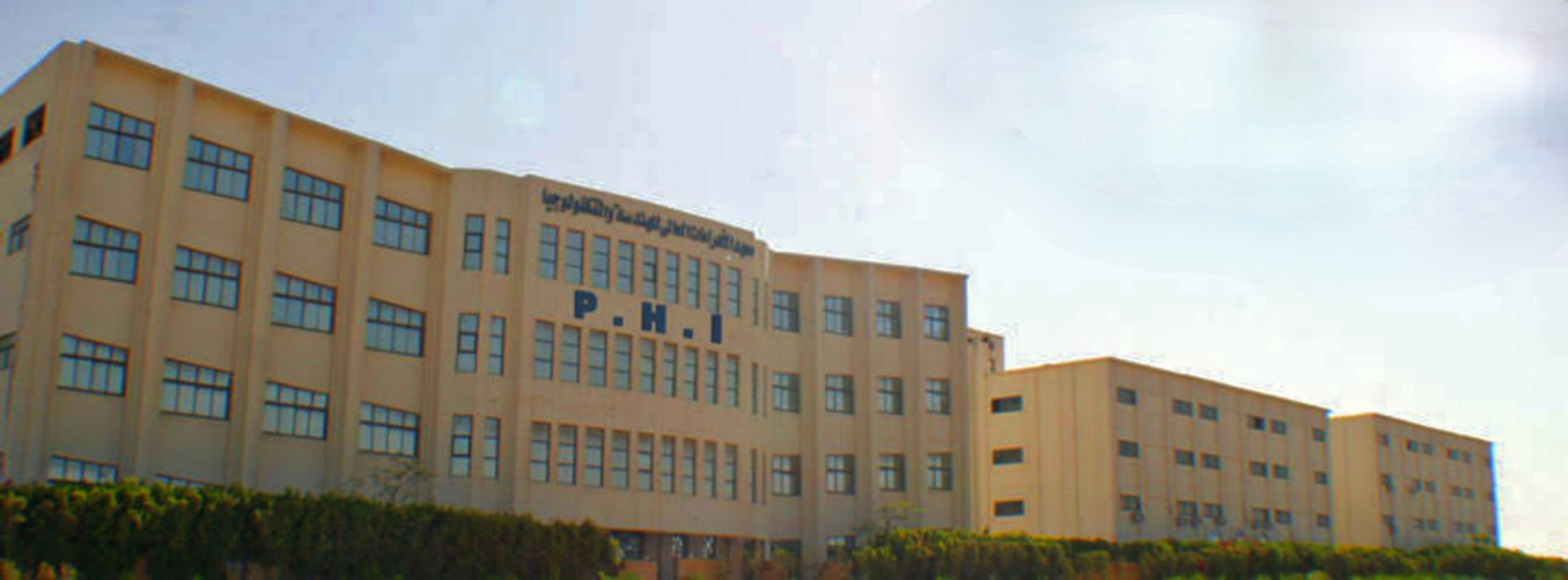
- Institute facilities overlooking the main street.
- Latin: pyramides superiores instituti ad ipsum et technologia
- Other name: PHI
- Type: Private Higher Institute
- Established: 2007 (19 years ago)
- Chairman: Mohamed Hamdy Zaki
- Dean: Mohamed Ismail Doma
- Academic staff: ~60
- Students: ~2500 Students in all divisions
- Other students: ~4300 Graduated students
- Location: Al-Ferdous Residential City, 6th of October, Giza Governorate, 12578, Egypt
- Language: English, Arabic
- Website: www.phi.edu.eg
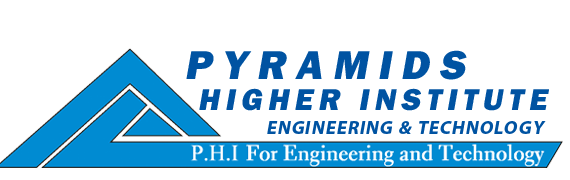
- Note: The original page in Arabic contains more detailed information.

Pyramids Higher Institute for Engineering and Technology (PHI) (Arabic: معهد الأهرامات العالي للهندسة والتكنولوچيا) is an Egyptian private higher institute in 6th of October City, Giza Governorate. Established in 2007 by Engineer Mohamed Hamdy Zaki by Ministerial Resolution No. (2591) of the same year in accordance with Law No. 52 of 1970. The institute specializes in the study of engineering and is considered one of the leading higher institutes locally. It is divided into five departments covering the most important engineering fields required in the labor market at the local and international levels. The institute is affiliated with Al Baraka Society for Social and Educational Services.

== Study system ==
After 2017, studying at the Institute became a two-semester system (the traditional system), in which the academic year is divided into two semesters and a summer vacation. If the student passes the courses in one of the academic level, he moves directly to the next level, and is allowed to fail in only one or two courses. They can be repeated in the same semester of the following year in addition to the courses of the level to which he transferred. However, if the student fails in more than two courses in The same academic year remains in the same level to re-study the courses in which he failed, regardless of the student’s grade in any of the courses of the two semesters (unlike the credit-hour system). In order to obtain a bachelor's degree, the student needs to pass all the compulsory courses, and a certain number of elective courses required by the Institute for graduation after studying for a minimum period of four years in the specialized department, in addition to the first preparatory year, and passing at least two professional trainings in one of the engineering companies and offices.

Until 2017, studying at the institute was in the credit-hour system, in which the academic year is divided into two main semesters, the first fall semester and the second spring semester, in addition to an optional third summer semester, which is a combination of studying theoretical courses and practicing professional training in an engineering company or office. To obtain a bachelor's degree in this system, a student needs to study a number of courses with at least 172 credit hours, and successfully pass all courses with a GPA of no less than 2.0 (out of a total of 4.0).

== Enrollment ==
=== Admissions ===
The nomination of students to the institute is made through the Coordination Office for admission unless a decision is issued by the Ministry of Higher Education to the contrary. Non-Egyptian students are accepted through the Expatriates Department. The institute accepts students who have one of the following qualifications:

- The Egyptian General Secondary Certificate (Thanawya 'Amma), the scientific section, Mathematics, and the equivalent of Arab and foreign certificates
- Al-Azhar secondary certificate (Thanawya Azharya)
- Industrial high school diploma, three-year system
- Industrial high school diploma, five-year system
- Industrial Technical Institutes

It is not permissible for a student to register his name in more than one institute at the same time, and it is not permissible to combine enrollment in an institute that is not affiliated with the ministry or any university college, and It is not permissible to re-enroll the student in any institute to obtain a certificate he previously obtained.

=== Transfer students ===
Student enrollment is transferred between the corresponding institutes and colleges according to the following rules:

- A student enrolled in the credit-hour system may be transferred to the two-semester system as long as he does not pass 60% of the total credit hours required for graduation. A set-off is made for the courses that the student has passed in the credit-hour system, and the equivalent courses are determined in the academic program to which he is to be transferred.
- It is not permissible to consider the transfer of students enrolled in the first year between the corresponding institutes unless the student has achieved the minimum score reached by the admission to the institute to which the transfer is required, and it is also required that he be successful in the academic courses (with a maximum of failure in one of the basic subjects) as long as No other instructions from the Ministry of Higher Education have been found
- It is not permissible to accept expelled students
- A student may not be transferred from the credit-hour system to the two-semester system if they do not meet the admission requirements for the two-semester system upon joining the college

In all cases, the review and approval of the competent head of the central administration is required.

== Bachelor's degree programs ==
The institute has five departments, each of which offers a program of study in a specific engineering discipline. Whoever successfully completes the study program in one of these disciplines will be awarded a bachelor's degree in this engineering discipline, and the Egyptian Minister of Higher Education and Scientific Research will personally equate it with a bachelor's degree in engineering awarded by Egyptian universities that are subject to the Universities Organization Law No. 49 of 1972 and its executive regulations from the engineering faculties in corresponding disciplines.

These programs are:

- Civil Engineering Program
- Architecture Program
- Electrical Power and Control Engineering Program
- Mechatronics Engineering Program
- Electronics and Communications Engineering Program

== See also ==
- List of universities in Egypt
- Education in Egypt
