= Dreamland, Egypt =

Private urban development outside Cairo, Egypt

Coordinates: 29.9728°N 31.0368°E

Dreamland is a private urban development and gated community located in 6 October City, a satellite city of Cairo, Egypt. Its construction began in 1995 on lands sold by the Egyptian government to businessman Ahmed Bahgat. Designed as a North American-style residential suburb for the wealthy, it includes an amusement park, a five-star hotel, and a golf course.

The project has been criticized by some, such as economist David Sims, as a case of land speculation and an example of the Egyptian government's problematic attempts to promote the creation of settlements in the deserts outside Cairo. By 2008, most of the 840 hectares purchased by Bahgat had remained undeveloped and he was reportedly trying to sell off the remaining land to pay debts.

== See also ==
- Greater Cairo
