= Misr University for Science and Technology =

Private university in Egypt

- جامعة مصر للعلوم والتكنولوجيا
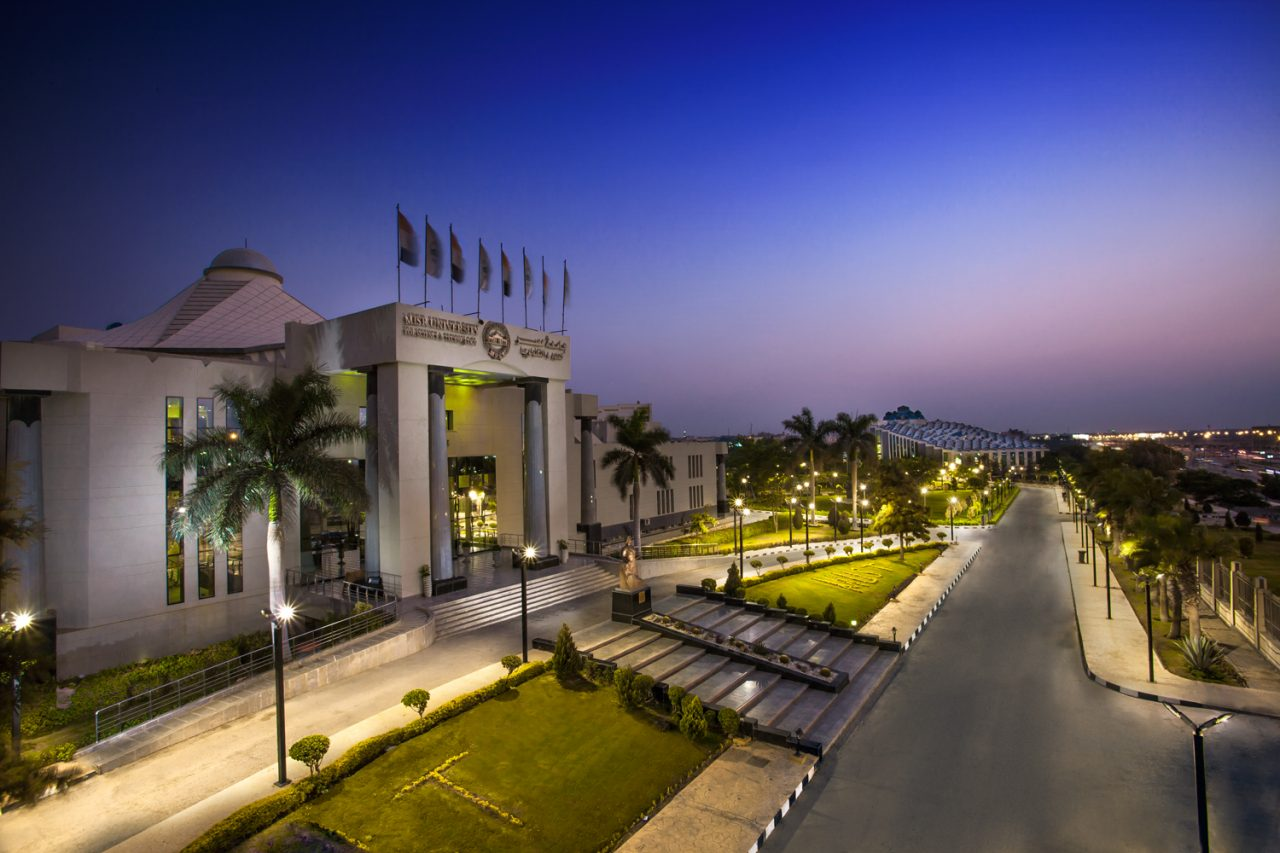
- Motto: Knowledge is Power
- Type: Private
- Established: 1996
- President: Hala El-Menoufy (acting)
- Students: 35,000
- Location: Al Motamayez District – 6th of October, Egypt
- Language: English & Arabic
- Website: www.must.edu.eg

Misr University for Science and Technology (MUST) is a private university in 6th of October City, Giza, Egypt.

== Overview ==
Misr University for Science and Technology was established by presidential decree number 245 for 1996. Degrees awarded are accredited by the Supreme Council of Universities. It comprises 14 faculties that follow the credit hours system.

== Faculties ==
- Faculty of Medicine
- Faculty of Dental Surgery
- Faculty of Pharmacy
- Faculty of Applied Medical Sciences
- Faculty of Physical Therapy
- Faculty of Engineering
- Faculty of Biotechnology
- Faculty of Information Technology
- Faculty of Business and Economics
- Faculty of Media and Mass Communication
- Faculty of Archaeology and Tourist Guidance
- Faculty of Special Education
- Faculty of Foreign Languages and Translation
- Faculty of Nursing

== Associations ==
MUST is an active member of the Association of Arab Universities, the International Association of University Presidents (IAUP), and the Association of African Universities (AAU).

== See also ==
- Education in Egypt
- List of universities in Egypt
