= Sheikh Zayed City =

Sheikh Zayed City مدينة الشيخ زايد
- City
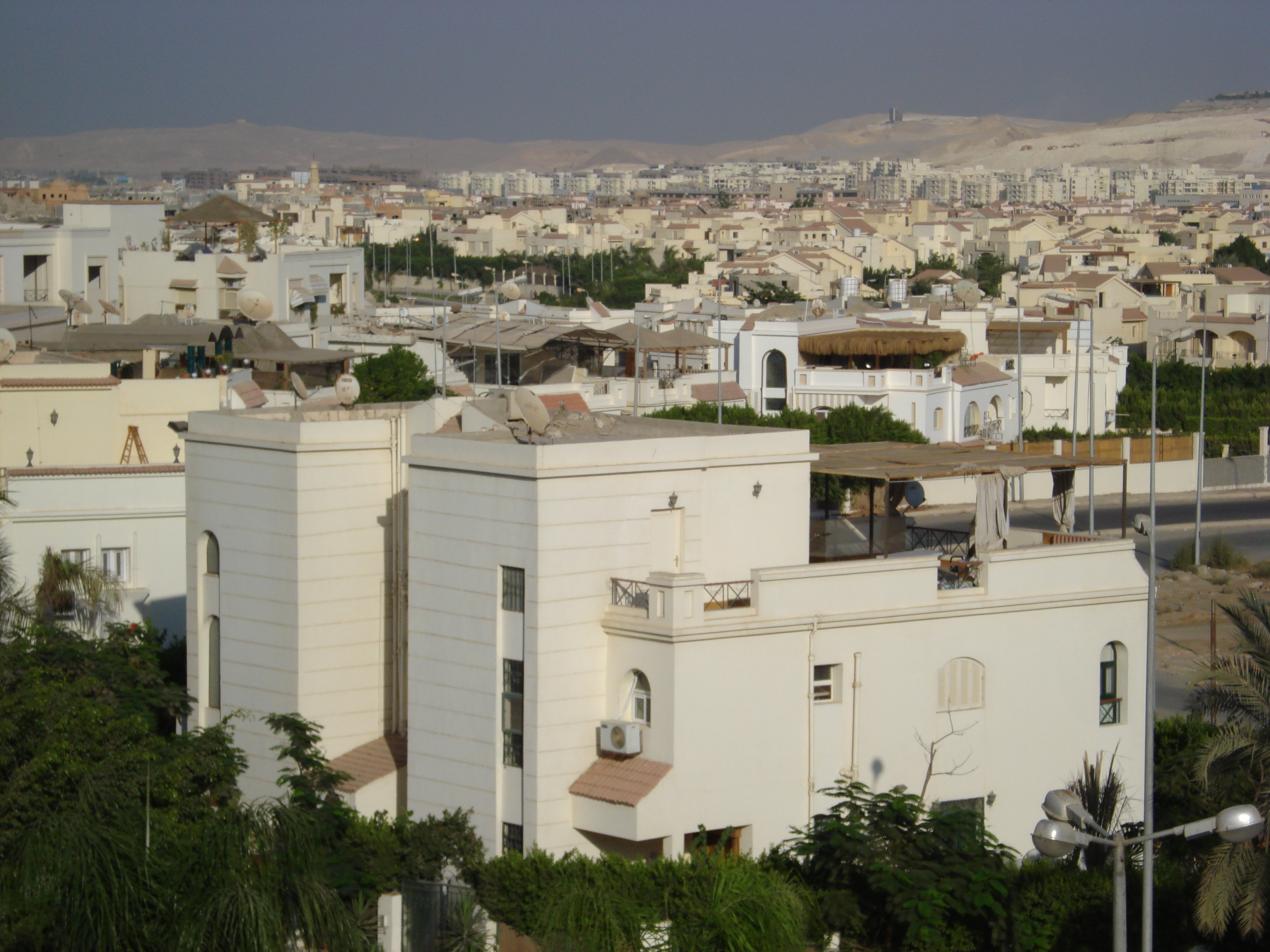
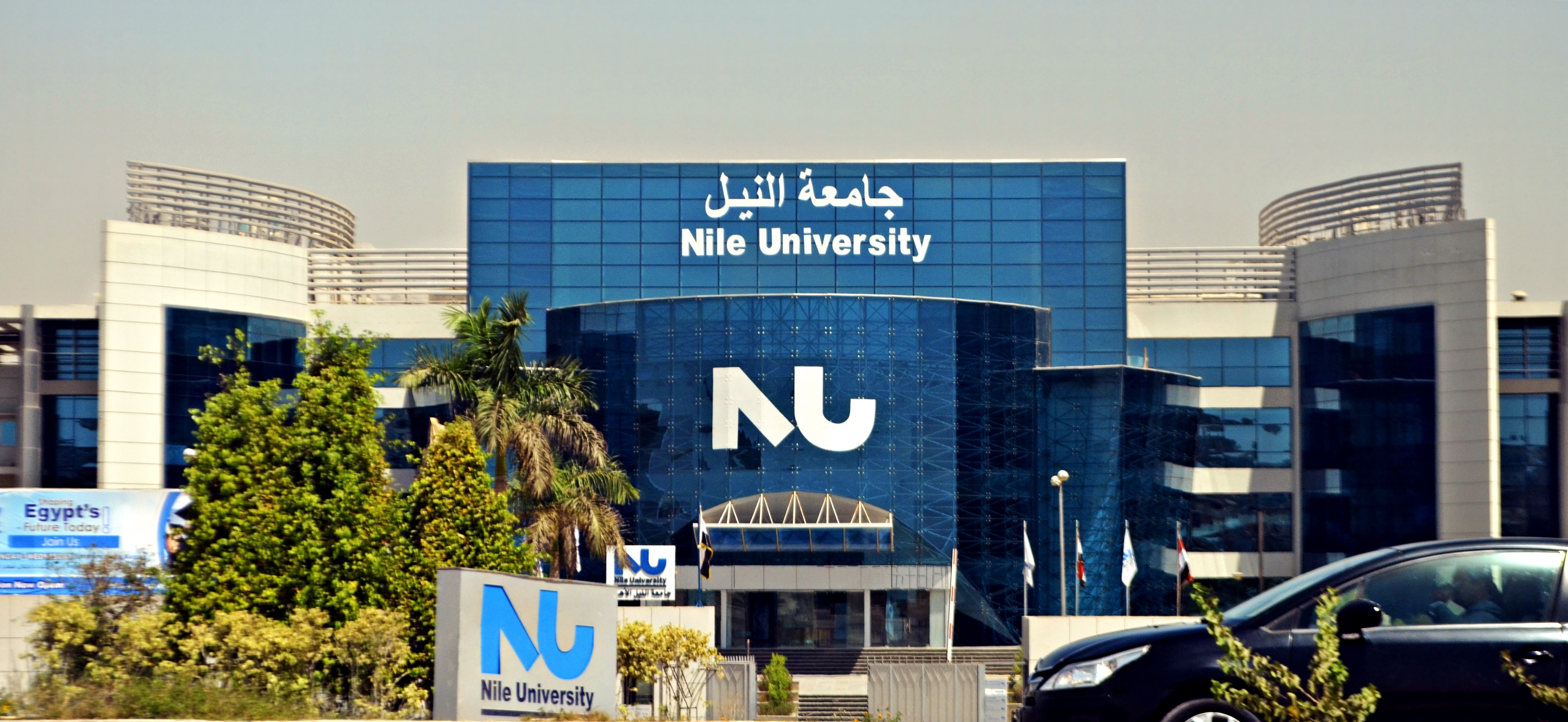
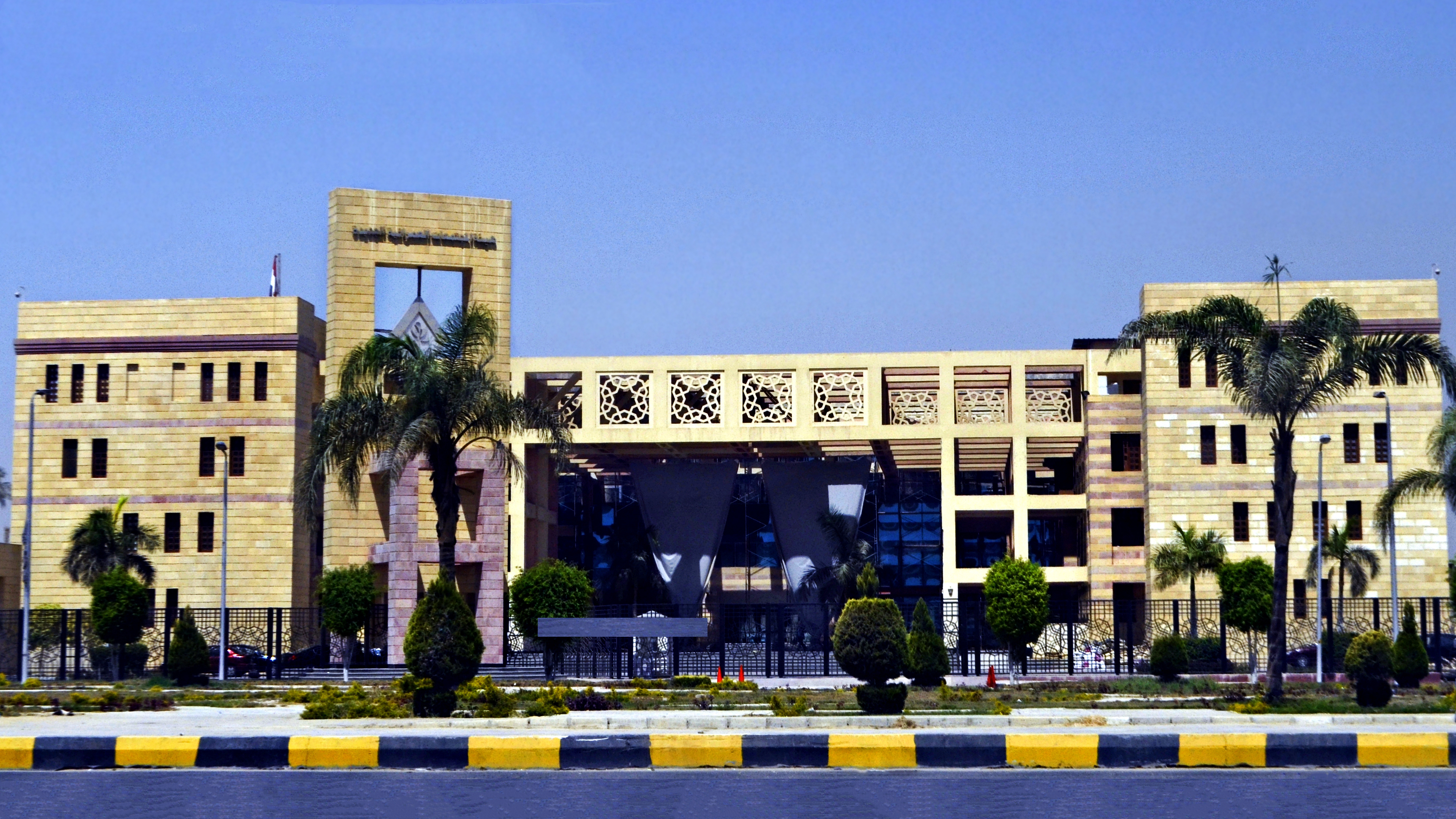
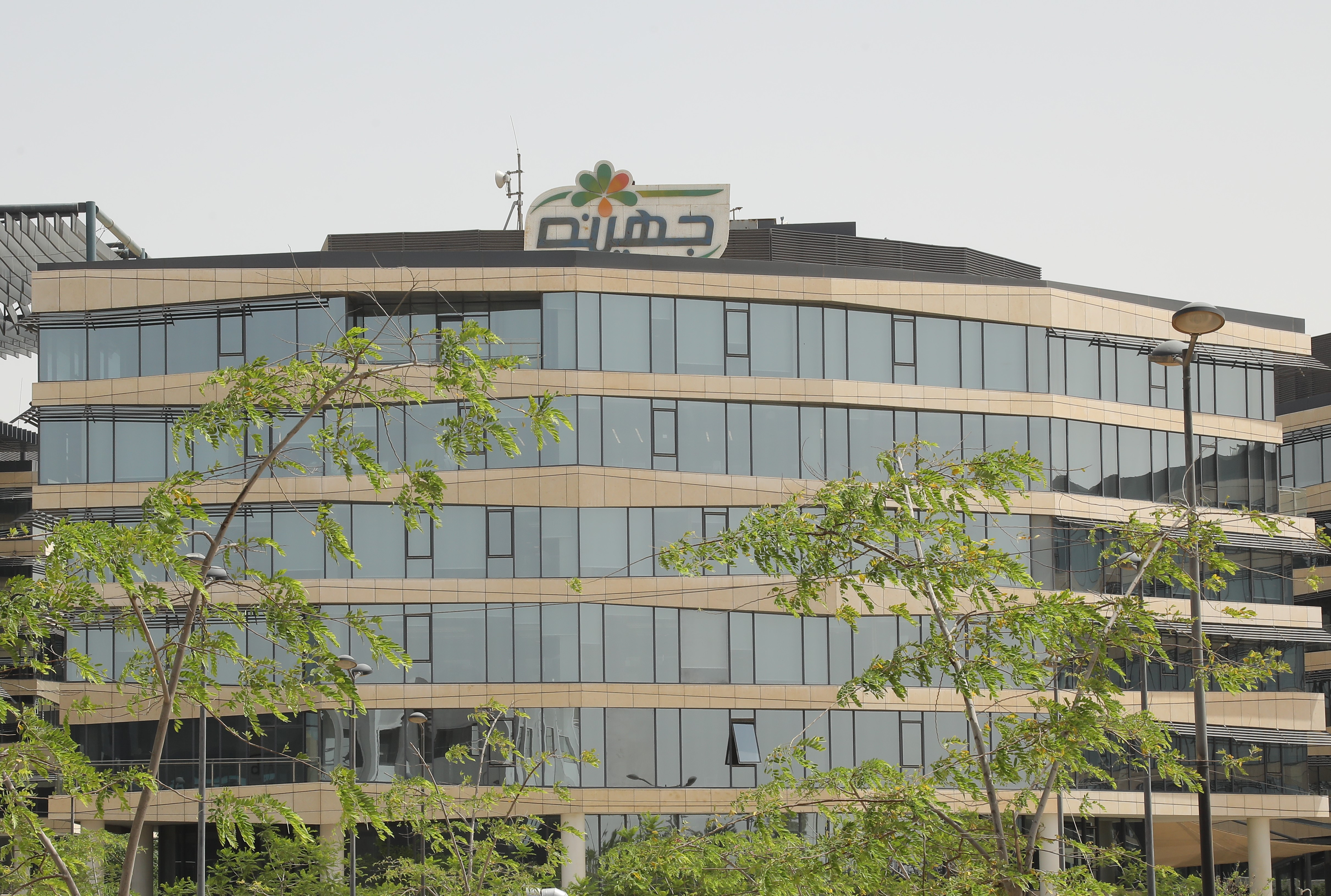
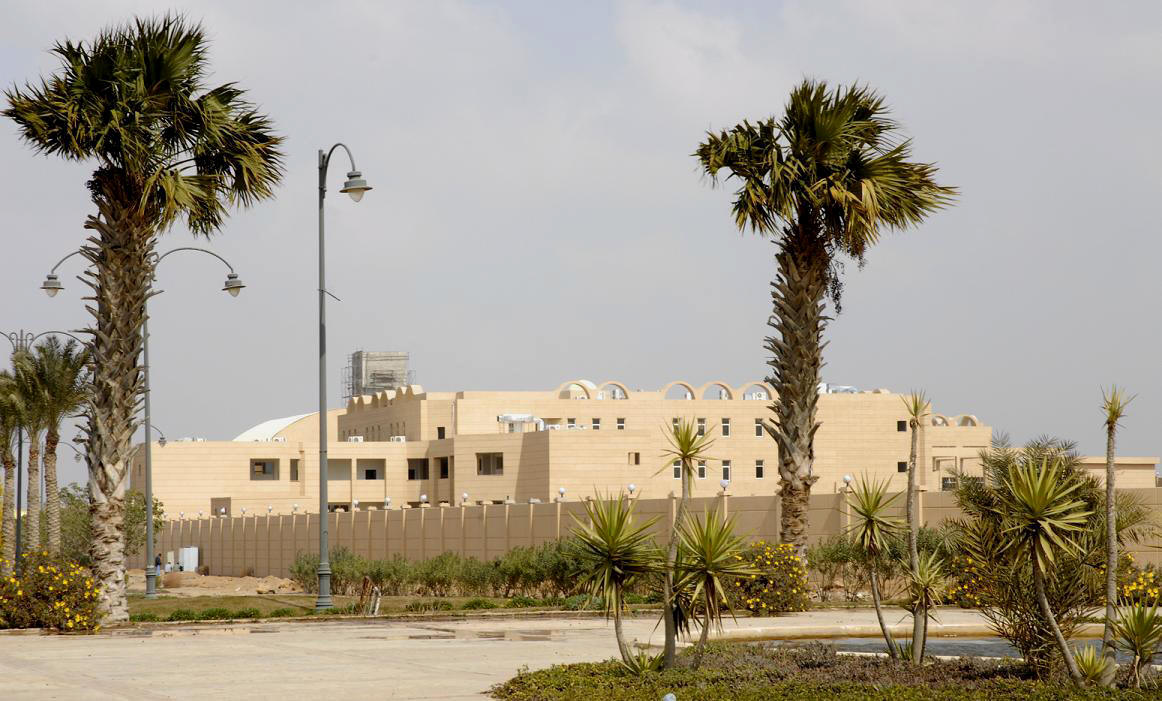
- City suburbs Nile University NUCA Juhayna Food Industries British International School

- Location in Egypt
- Coordinates: 30°03′N 31°0′E
- Country: Egypt
- Governorate: Giza
- Metropolitan area: Greater Cairo
- Established: 1994

Government
  - Chairman Of City Development Authority: Moustafa Fahmey

Area
  - Total: 19 sq mi (49 km^{2})

Population (January 2019)
  - Total: 90,000 Residents with Sheikh Zayed IDs 375,000 Total Residents living in Sheikh Zayed (estimated based on electric meter installation figures)
- Time zone: UTC+2 (EET)
  - Summer (DST): UTC+3 (EEST)

Sheikh Zayed City (Egyptian Arabic: مدينة الشيخ زايد) is a city in Giza Governorate, Egypt and part of the Greater Cairo urban area. Established in 1995, located approximately 20 km from the Mohandiseen district and 28 km from Tahrir Square in the Downtown Cairo. The city is bordered by the Cairo–Alexandria desert road, the extension of the 26th of July Corridor, and 6th of October city. The population of Sheikh Zayed administrative district was estimated at 99,891 on 1 July 2025 by Egypt's Central Agency for Public Mobilization and Statistics (CAPMAS).

The city sits at an elevation of approximately 220 meters above sea level and covers an area of about 9,500 acres. It is planned to reach a population of 500,000 upon completion of the city's development.

== History ==
=== 20th anniversary ===
Sheikh Zayed City celebrated its 20th anniversary in November 2014. A technology centre opened during the anniversary celebrations to provide services to citizens through the Sheikh Zayed online portal.. Housing Minister Mostafa Madbouly said that the Urban Communities Authority’s budget had been expanded for the 2014/2015 fiscal year so that all planned projects could be implemented and completed. During the anniversary celebrations, Residents complained to Madbouly about a lack of services, including unfinished facilities in the Ebny Beitak area and the second phase of the Abnaa El-Giza project.

== Geography ==
Sheikh Zayed City is situated about 20 km (12 mi) from Lebanon Square in the Mohandiseen district of Giza. The city is bordered to the north by the Cairo-Alexandria desert road, to the south by the 26th of July Corridor, and to the west by the neighboring 6th of October.

The city forms part of the Giza Governorate, and is divided into 17 residential districts, with four neighborhoods in each district.

Sheikh Zayed City sits 226 meters above mean sea level.

== Climate ==
Köppen-Geiger climate classification system classifies its climate as hot desert (BWh). Its climate is very similar to Giza and Cairo, owing to its proximity to them.

Climate data for Sheikh Zayed City
Month	Jan	Feb	Mar	Apr	May	Jun	Jul	Aug	Sep	Oct	Nov	Dec	Year
Mean daily maximum °C (°F)	18.7 (65.7)	20.4 (68.7)	23.4 (74.1)	27.7 (81.9)	31.7 (89.1)	34.2 (93.6)	34.4 (93.9)	34.2 (93.6)	32 (90)	29.8 (85.6)	25 (77)	20.4 (68.7)	27.7 (81.8)
Daily mean °C (°F)	12.3 (54.1)	13.5 (56.3)	16.3 (61.3)	19.7 (67.5)	23.5 (74.3)	26.3 (79.3)	27.2 (81.0)	27.1 (80.8)	25 (77)	22.8 (73.0)	18.7 (65.7)	14.2 (57.6)	20.5 (69.0)
Mean daily minimum °C (°F)	6 (43)	6.6 (43.9)	9.2 (48.6)	11.7 (53.1)	15.4 (59.7)	18.4 (65.1)	20.1 (68.2)	20 (68)	18.1 (64.6)	15.9 (60.6)	12.4 (54.3)	8 (46)	13.5 (56.3)
Average precipitation mm (inches)	4 (0.2)	5 (0.2)	3 (0.1)	2 (0.1)	1 (0.0)	0 (0)	0 (0)	0 (0)	0 (0)	1 (0.0)	3 (0.1)	5 (0.2)	24 (0.9)
Source: Climate-Data.org

== Education ==
=== Schools ===
- The American International School in Egypt West Campus is located in Sheikh Zayed City.
- Beverly Hills Schools (Deutsche Schule Beverly Hills Kairo, American Beverly Hills School, English Beverly Hills School)
- The Maharat Super Global School
- Elsheikh Zayed Secondary Schools For boys
- Elsheikh Zayed Secondary Schools For girls
- New Manor House School
- Ethos International School
- Greenland international school
- The British School, CAIRO (BISC)
- Core West College
- Norwich International school
- Marvel International School
- Evolution International School

=== List of universities ===
- The Canadian International University
- Faculty of engineering Cairo University
- Cairo University (CU) in Sheikh Zayed City
- Faculty of commerce English Section
- Nile University
- National Training Academy
- Arab Academy for Science, Technology and Maritime Transport

== Cityscape ==
=== Residential Compounds ===
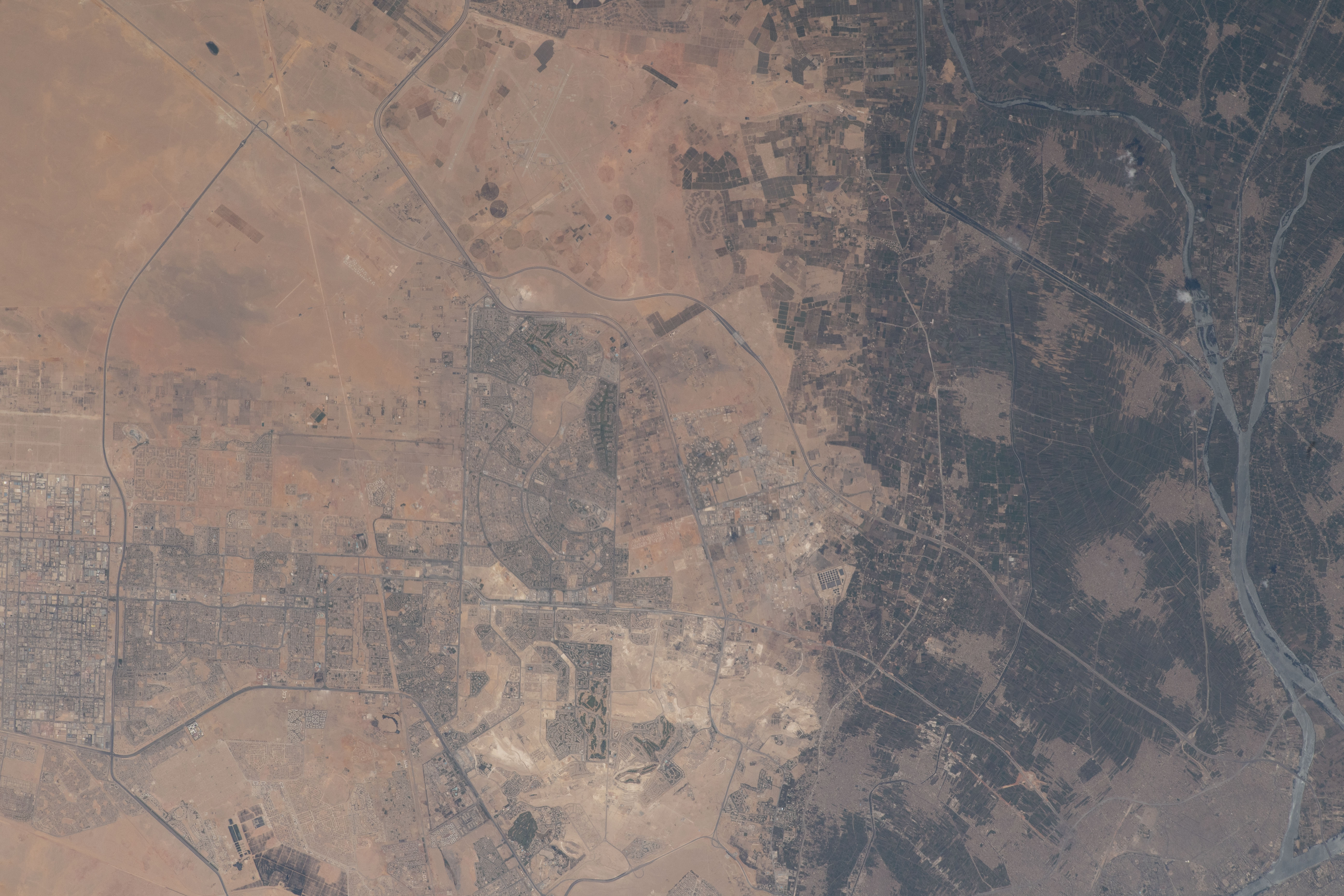
Sheikh Zayed City and the 6th of October City

- Al Karma Residence Compound
- Al Karma 4 Compound
- Greens
- Beverly Hills
- Aeon Towers
- Swanlake Residences 6 October
- Village West by Dorra
- Kayan
- Zed Towers
- Elyasmine
- The address
- Rawdet Zayed
- Opera City
- Royal City
- Tiamo City
- El Khamayl
- Palm Hills
- El Nada
- El Joman
- La Ville
- El Gezira
- Sama Zayed
- Sulaymaniyah Gardens
- Zayed 2000
- Vye
- Safwa City
- The Courtyards
- Cairo Gate
- Casa
- El Patio Zahraa
- Al Karma Gates
- Etapa
- Alma
- Six West
- Westown Residences
- The Estates
- Belle Ville
- Meadows Park
- Zayed Dunes
- Karmell
- Atrio
- Forty West
- Allegria
- El Rabwa
- Grand Heights
- Mountain View Chillout Park
- Richmont
- Jira
- Jiwar
- Janna Zayed 1
- Janna Zayed 2
- Green Residence
- Green Valley
- Mohandesein Gardens (Engineers)
- Contenital Gardens
- Housing Gardens
- El Mostakbal
- El Hay 1
- El Hay 2
- El Hay 3
- El Hay 4
- El Hay 5
- El Hay 6
- El Hay 7
- El Hay 8
- El Hay 9
- El Hay 10
- El Hay 11
- El Hay 12
- El Hay 13
- El Hay 16

== See also ==
- Smart Village
- List of cities and towns in Egypt
