= Culture and Science City =

Gathering of private higher institutes of education in Egypt

Coordinates: 29.95573°N 30.91414°E

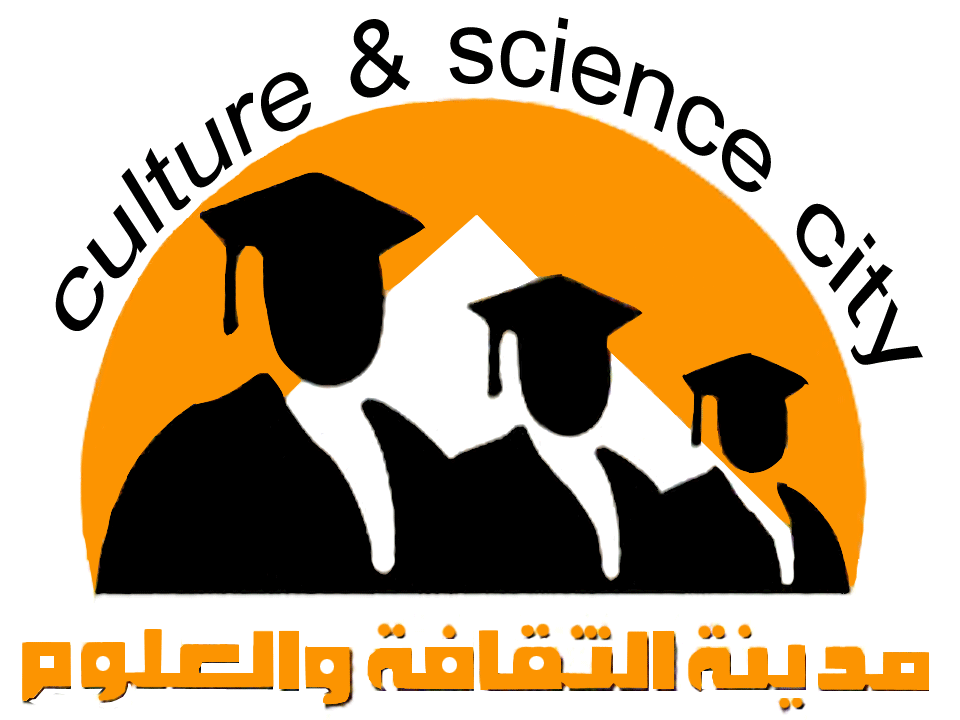
- Type: Private
- Location: Giza, Egypt
- Campus: Urban

The Culture and Science City (مدينة الثقافة و العلوم) is a gathering of private higher institutes of education in Egypt, composed of ten specialized higher institutes all recognized by the Supreme Council of Egyptian universities.

The institute contains 30 scientific departments in various disciplines, including engineering, administration, and the humanities.

== Programmes ==
The Culture and Science City has two campuses; the first is located in 6th of October city, and the second campus in a Sheraton hotel. The component institutions are distributed thus:

6 October Campus

- Higher Institute of Engineering
- Higher Institute for Mass media and Communication Techniques;
- Higher Institute for Computer science and Information systems;
- Higher Institute of Languages;
- Higher Institute of Administrative Sciences;
- Higher Institute of Economics and Environment;
- Higher Institute for Social work;

Sheraton Campus

- Higher Institute for Optics Technology;
- Egyptian Higher Institute for Tourism and Hotels;
- Higher Institute for Languages - (Sheraton Buildings).

== See also ==
- List of universities in Egypt
