= Thanaweya Amma =

Egyptian standardized test regime

Thanaweya Amma (Arabic: ثانوية عامة ) is a series of standardized tests in Egypt that lead to the General Secondary Education Certificate for public secondary schools and serves as the entrance examination for Egyptian public universities.

Thanaweya Amma means 'General Secondary' in Modern Standard Arabic. In the context of Egypt's education system, it refers to the general (as opposed to technical or vocational) secondary education track, the completion exams at the end of the track, and the diploma a student earns by passing the exams. This article is about the exams.

== Overview ==
At the end of the final year of secondary school, students sit for comprehensive examinations for each of the five core subjects they took that year. The content of the exams and their relative weight in scoring depends on the students' curricular concentration, either Literature Stream, Science Stream, or Math Stream. These scores are turned into a composite and ranked within each track. The top scores are published online.

Thanaweya Amma is one of several examinations that public school students take that serves dual purpose of completion certificate and entrance examination, determining what education pathways students will follow. Students at the end of primary school sit for the qabuul examination, which determines their admittance into general preparatory school. At the end of preparatory school, students sit for the Adaadiya Amma (General Preparatory) examination which serves as the completion certificate for preparatory school. High scores admit students to the General Secondary track, while low scores will track students to technical or vocational secondary school. More students enroll in technical school than general secondary school; in 2005/6 approximately 38.7% of secondary students were in the general secondary track. The Thanaweya Amma examination is taken by students who have completed the General Secondary track; students who are tracked into vocational or technical schools do not sit for the exam and have little chance of attending university.

Thanaweya Amma can also be taken by private school students in national curriculum schools accredited by the Ministry of Education. Additionally, private language schools can teach students the national curriculum but with certain core subjects taught in languages other than Arabic. The Ministry of Education has translated the exams to accommodate.

Thanaweya Amma has historically tested acquired knowledge, though reforms beginning in the 1990s introduced aptitude assessment as well.

== University Entrance ==
The admissions process to Egyptian public universities is managed by the Coordination Office of the Ministry of Higher Education (usually referred to as Tansiq). Each year, the office publishes a list of colleges and institutes and the minimum test scores required for each. Students who have completed their exam submit their preferences and the Coordination Office places them in a program.

For 2012, the most demanding programs in terms of Thanaweya Amma scores were:

Literature Track	Minimum Score	Science Track	Minimum Score
Economics and Political Science at Cairo	393.5	College of Medicine in Qena	409.5
Media at Cairo	390.5	Medicine at Shebin El Koum Menoufia University	408.5
Languages at Ain Shams	383.5	Medicine at Mansoura	408.5
Languages at Minia	380.0	Medicine at Tanta	408.0
College of Languages and Translation at Aswan	380.0	Medicine at Souhaj	408.0
Archeology at Cairo	378.0	Medicine at Assouit	408.0
Education at Al-Wadi Al-Jadid	378.0	Petroleum and Mining at Suez University	408.0
College of Education at Qena, Al-Wadi Al-Janub University	377.0	Medicine at Zaqaziq	407.5
Arts and Fine Arts at Alexandria	375.0	Medicine at Alexandria	407.5
Archeology at Fayoum	374.5	Medicine at Banha	407.0
Education at Damanhour	374.0	Medicine at Minia	407.0

For 2012, the least demanding programs in terms of Thanaweya Amma scores were:

Literature Track	Minimum Score	Science Track	Minimum Score
Al-Ajami Higher Institute for Management Sciences	205.0	Boys Physical Education at Assouit	205.0
High Institute for Computers and Informatics, International Business Division at Tanta	205.0	Languages and Translation in Zaytoun	205.0
High Institute for Hospitality at Luxor (EGOTH)	205.0	Quality Studies at Giza Department of Commerce Sciences	205.0
High Institute for Commercial and Computer Science, Accounting Division at Al-Arish	205.0	High Institute for Quality Studies and Languages at Giza	205.0
High Institute for Management and Accounting, Systems Division at Ras Al-Bar	205.0	High Institute Management Sciences at Gianaclis	205.0
High Institute for Tourism and Hospitality at Ismailia	205.0	High Institute For Management Sciences at Tamouh, Giza	205.0
High Institute for Accounting and Informatics, Systems Division at Tanta	205.0	Technical School for Social Services in Qena	205.0
City High Institute for Management at Technology, Management Division in Shabramant	205.0	Boys Physical Education at Helwan	205.0
College of Quality Education at Damietta	205.0	Girls Physical Education at Gazira Helwan	205.0
International Academy of Engineering and Information Sciences (Division of Business Administration	205.0	Nursing at Alexandria	205.0

== History ==
=== Tradition of Assessment during Ottoman and British Rule ===
Eleanor Hargreaves argues that the Thanaweya Amma draws on assessment traditions grounded in the introduction of European education in Egypt through colonial structures. During 19th and first half of the 20th centuries, assessment served the function of selecting elites for military or civil service. The earliest predecessor to the exam dates back to the French occupation of Egypt from 1798 to 1801, during which the French initiated an assessment system to screen for elite candidates for military college. After the end of the occupation, Mohammed Ali assumed power and undertook large-scale efforts to modernize the Egyptian state, including expanding the education system. Subsequent reforms set up a Baccalaureate system in which elite Mamluks attended secondary school and sat for exams to attend higher education and gain admittance to Egypt's military or civil service.

During the British occupation from 1882 to 1952, the assessment system continued to serve this function. This period saw the advent of elementary schools which, though exclusive and fee-based, helped prepare students for secondary school. Because the overall function of the education system was still to train elite Egyptians for service in British colonial bureaucracy, the number of positions available upon completion were limited. Thus, a primary school assessment system was implemented to screen for elite candidates to compete for bureaucratic positions in secondary school. Primary school enrollment remained low.

=== The 1952 Revolution and the Nasser Period ===
The 1952 Revolution and the eventual ascension of Gamal Abdel Nasser to the presidency marked a significant change in the function of education in Egypt, as it was transformed from a system of recruiting and training elites, to a system of instilling national unity and promoting national development. Enrollment rates exploded as primary school was made mandatory in 1953.

The Nasser government's changes to the education system created the Thanaweya Amma exam in its modern form. Education was Arabized and standardized, and with abolition of most private schools, became almost entirely under the purview of the state. Testing itself became a point of national unity – students around the country sat for the same exams at the same time.

The great importance placed on the Thanawey Amma sprung not only from changes to the test itself, but also the way the new government recast education's role in Egyptian society. On a rhetorical level, education was exalted as a means of national development; it was enshrined as a citizen's right and played a key role in Arab nationalist discourse. Thus, achievement in education, and in turn, achievement on assessments, increasingly became a means of social mobility for low and middle class Egyptians historically excluded from the system.

The new rhetorical appeal of education was augmented by specific policies which made social mobility through education more feasible for many Egyptians. The 1952 Revolution led to the expulsion or exclusion of the historical class of elite or foreign civil servants, opening many government positions previously accessed only class privilege. Thus, formal assessment (at least ostensibly) became the primary means of achieving government posts.

Moreover, in 1957, the Egyptian Parliament extended free public school education all the way through the university level (primary education had been free since 1930; and secondary education had been free since 1950), meaning that any student who passed the Thanaweya Amma exam would be granted a spot in a public university. Then, beginning in 1961–2, the government began extending public sector employment guarantees to graduates of public tertiary institutions, beginning with universities, and then extending to vocation secondary and technical institutes in 1946 (under Law 14) and finally all military conscripts under Law 85 of 1973.

Thus, the Thanaweya Amma test became a crucial step for many Egyptians to access what became government entitlements (university education and subsequent employment). Its importance was compounded by the fact that social mobility depended in part on a student's score on the exam. Hargreaves argues that because education was structured as a means of national development, and not necessarily personal economic or social gain, students were allocated to universities based on the government's needs. The government used Thanaweya Amma scores as a means of students who would attend elite programs versus those who would attend less prestigious institutions. Thus, students generally enrolled in the programs for which their scores qualified them.

=== Sadat and Mubarak Eras ===
Education during the Sadat and Mubarak eras was marked by a number of government policies to incrementally scale back the entitlements extended during Nasser era.

The government's gradual repeal of the employment guarantee, through extending the wait period for government employment after university graduation, decreased the employment prospects for public school students. Throughout the course of the 1980s, the wait period was extended from two years to five years. By the time it guarantee was completely abolished in the 1990s the wait period has reached 13 years. In tandem with this policy (and in fact, extending all the way back to Sadat's Infitah), the government encouraged the private sector to drive employment growth.

While this change would have ostensibly decreased the stakes of the Thanaweya Amma test, Sadat's education policies also encouraged the growth of private, fee-based education; these policies continued through the Mubarak era, especially in the late 1980s under Education Minister Fathi Sorour. As a result, those with means migrated to a parallel private school system which became the feeder for private sector labor, while success in public school and on the Thanaweya Amma remained the incredibly important for the social mobility of those from lower classes.

A second policy was to decrease the percentage of students in the General Secondary track, and therefore the number of students sitting for the Thanaweya Amma exam. Throughout the 1980s, the government expanded the secondary technical education such that by the end of the decade, the percentage of technical secondary students outnumbered those in general secondary. This continues to be the case today. Thus, students are tracked away from university earlier, at the end of primary school.

== Criticism and Controversy ==
Securing the contents of the exam becomes an issue each year. Hargreaves argues that the structure and importance of the Thanaweya Amma exam results in what Ronald Dore called the ‘Diploma Disease,’ in which ‘selection for higher education and employment become the driving force behind schools.’ She argues that classrooms in Egypt become oriented around examination and memorization from the earliest levels. During their final year of schooling, students face immense time and examination pressures. She also argues that Egypt's explosion in private tutoring has to do with the enormous importance placed on examination results.
