= Higher Institute of Engineering =

Institute in 6 October City, Egypt

The Higher Institute of Engineering is an educational institute located in the Culture & Science City campus in 6th of October City, Egypt.

== History ==
The Higher Institute for Engineering, 6 October City (HIE) was founded on 18 October 1994. It was established by the Ministerial Decree No. 1484. The Supreme Council of Universities issued degree equivalency based on decree no. (49) on 4/6/2001.

== Programmes ==
The Institute grants the Bachelor of Science (BSc) degree in four engineering disciplines: Construction and Building Engineering (CBE); Information and Computer Engineering (ICE); Administrative Industrial Engineering (AIE); and Mecatronics Engineering (MTE).

== Accreditation ==
The undergraduate degree programmes, which last for 5 years, are accredited by the Supreme Council of Universities in Egypt, and its educational curriculum is supervised and revised by the Egyptian Ministry of Higher Education. The institute is affiliated with the Development of 6 October City Society.

== Credential summary ==
Bachelor's degree in engineering from a recognized university

Country: Egypt

Educational System: Credit Hours

Credential: Bachelor of Science (BSc)

Awarded by: Higher Institute of Engineering – 6 October City

Admission requirements: General Secondary Education Certificate

Length of Program: Five years
