= Deutsche Schule der Borromäerinnen Kairo =

Deutsche Schule der Borromäerinnen in Kairo

Location
- Mohamed Mahmoud Street 8 Cairo, Bab El-Louk; Egypt

Information
- School type: Private School
- Founded: 1904
- Status: Open
- Principal: Franz Baur
- Grades: 12
- Gender: female

Deutsche Schule der Borromäerinnen Kairo (DSB, Arabic: المدرسة الألمانیة سان شارل بالقاهرة) is a German school in Cairo, Egypt. It is a private school following the German academic system. Franz Baur has been the principal since 2019, following Georg Leber.

Since 1946 it has been a school for girls.

== See also ==
- Deutsche Schule der Borromäerinnen Alexandria
