= Inti (Ancient Egyptian official) =

Ancient Egyptian provincial official

- Overseer of royal fortresses
- Burial: Sumusta, Beni Suef, Egypt
- Spouse: Meret-Min

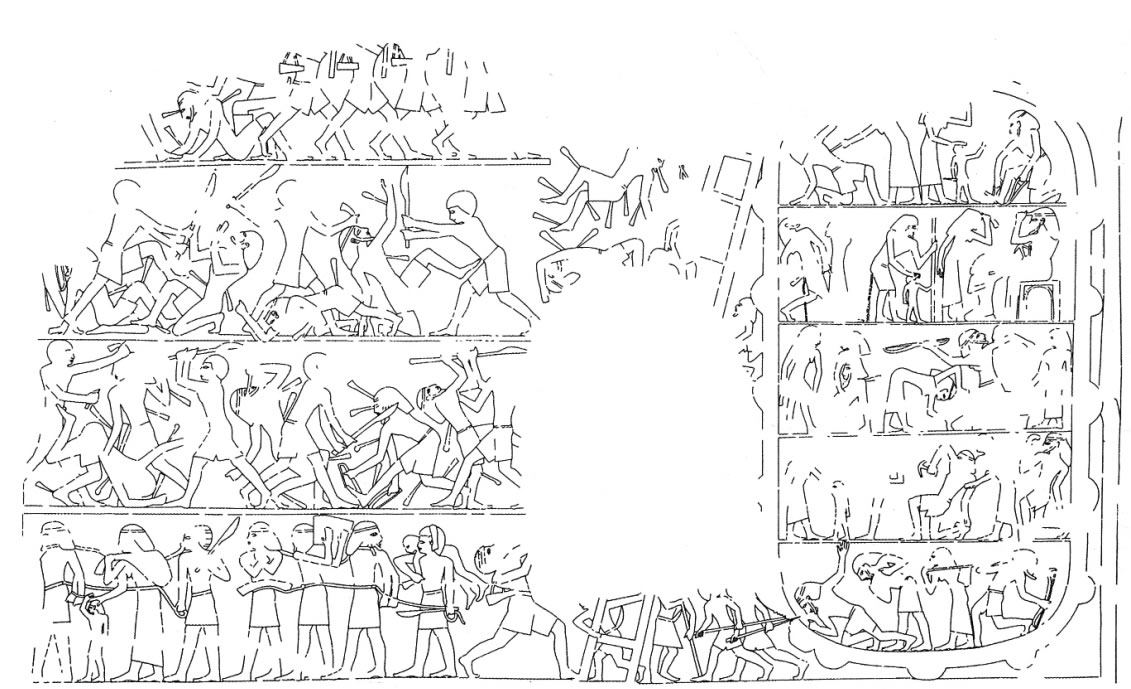
The siege of a Levantine fortress

Inti was an ancient Egyptian provincial official who lived in the 5th Dynasty and who is known from his rock-cut tomb at Dishasha. The tomb is famous as it shows on one wall the siege of a Levantine fortress or town.

Inti bears in his tomb several titles, that indicate that he was in charge of a province. The titles are typical for the 5th Dynasty and includeː overseer of commissions of the Naret-province, overseer of royal fortresses, administrator of the great estate and leader of the land. In his tomb chapel is also shown his wife, Meret-Min, but no children are mentioned for sure.

His tomb is a large complex with a chapel cut into the rocks. There are three pillars and several side rooms. The walls of the chapel are decorated with reliefs. They show daily life scenes, such as fishermen fishing, Inti traveling on a boat, or Inti and his wife at a festival.

An unusual scene in the tomb shows the siege of a Levantine town or fortess. In four register, Palestine people are depicted fighting against Egyptians. The fortress is shown as a big oval. Within the fortress are visible fights too and on the outside there is a big ladder, so that Egyptians could climb the walls of the fortress.

The tomb was first recorded and later published under Flinders Petrie. From 1991 to 1993 an Australian team of Egyptologists under Naguib Kanawati went back to Dishasha and recorded and published the tombs there again.

== Literature ==
- Naguib Kanawati & Ann McFarlane (1993), with contributions by Nabil Charoubim, Naguib Victor and A. Salamaː Deshasha: The Tombs of Inti, Shedu and Others, (Sydney). ISBN 0-85668-617-4, pp. 15-38, plates 1-13, 23-39
- Flinders Petrie (1898)ː Deshasheh, 1897, With a chapter by F. L1. Griffith. EEF Memoir onlin
