= Nenkhefetkai =

Ancient Egyptian provincial official

- Nomarch of the 20th nome of Upper Egypt
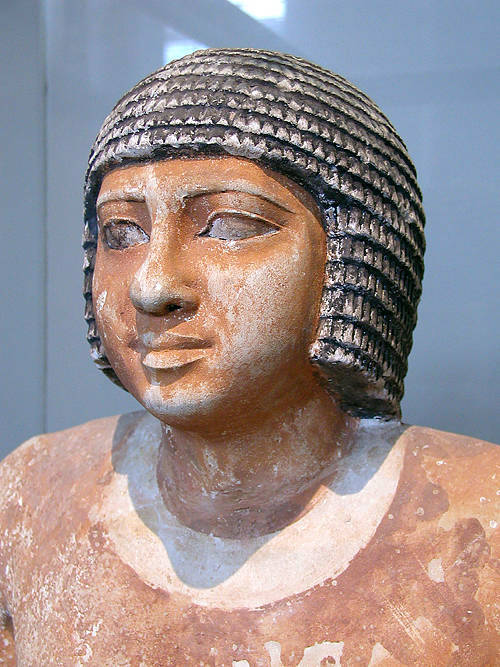
- Statue of Nenkhefetkai
- Tenure: c. 2200 BC
- Dynasty: 6th dynasty
- Burial: Beni Suef, Egypt
- Spouse: Nefer-shemes

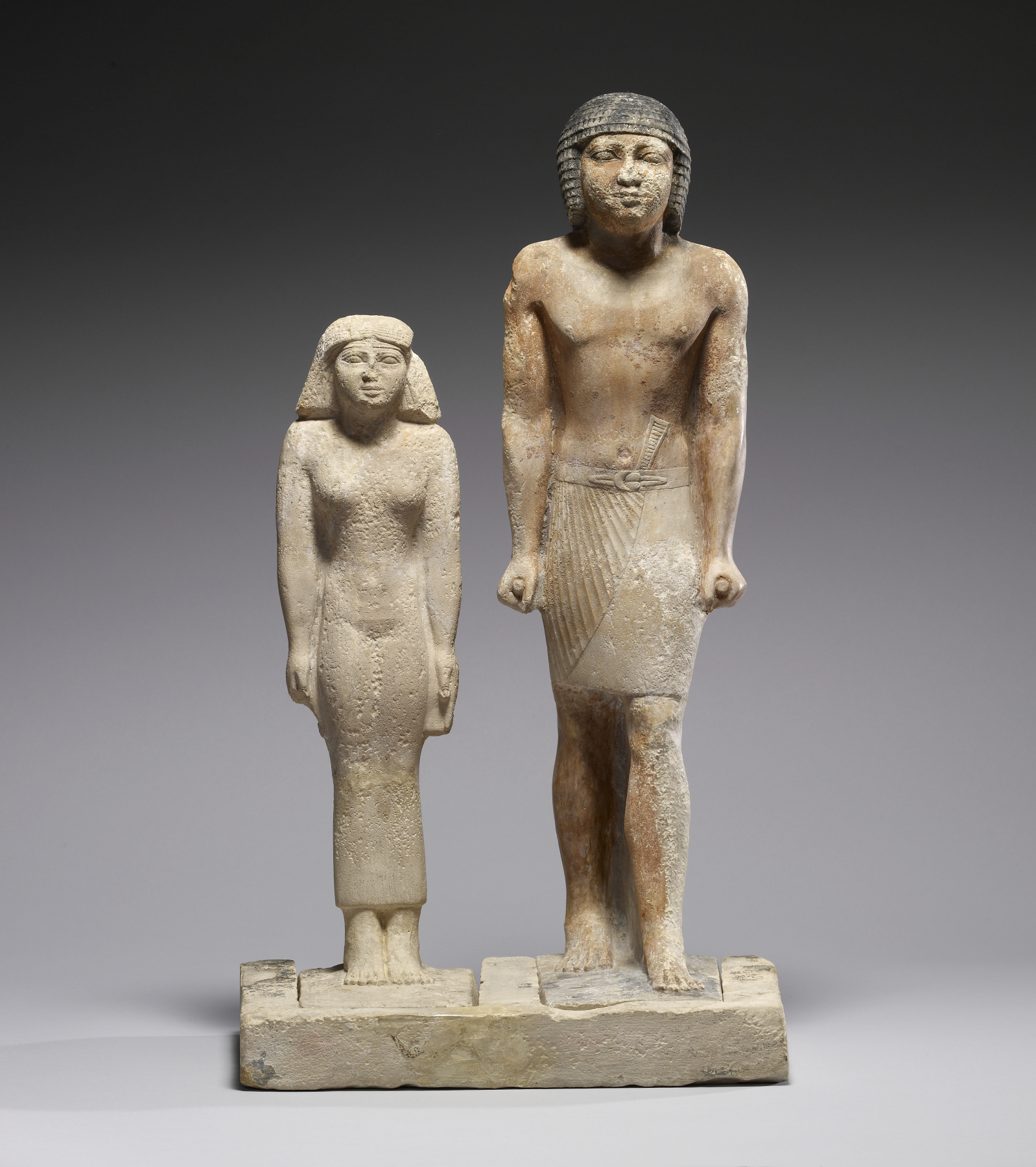
Statue of Nenkhefetkai and his wife Nefer-shemes

Nenkhefetkai (fl. c. 2200 BC) was an ancient Egyptian provincial official who lived around the end of the 6th Dynasty and is known from several statues found in the remains of his mastaba at Dishasha.

Nenkhefetkai was an important provincial official, who bears several titles providing evidence that he was a nomarch of Noret-Khent, the 20th Upper Egyptian nome. His titles include overseer of commissions, the one who knows the king, administrator of the southern goat city, sole friend, scribe of royal documents in the presence and leader of the lad of southern Naret.

Nenkhefetkai is known from a series of statues and from his inscribed coffin. He was once buried in a mastaba at Dishasha. The building was excavated by Flinders Petrie but was found heavily destroyed, to an extent that it was no longer possible to gain a plan or any measurements of this structure. Within the remains was found a serdab with the fragments of at least 12 statues. Some of them were well preserved, others were only found in fragments. Due to the different spellings of the name, Petrie assumed that the statues belonged to two different people, father and son, both called Nenkhefetkai. However, it is more likely that the name was just spelled differently on different monuments and that there was only one Nenkhefetkai buried here.

== Literature ==
- Naguib Kanawati & Ann McFarlane (1993), with contributions by Nabil Charoubim, Naguib Victor and A. Salamaː Deshasha: The Tombs of Inti, Shedu and Others, (Sydney). ISBN 0-85668-617-4, pp. 71–74, plates 22, 61
- Flinders Petrie (1898)ː Deshasheh, 1897, With a chapter by F. L1. Griffith. EEF Memoir online, 12–15, plates XXIX-XXXII
