= Ihnasya =

Ihnasya إهناسيا
- Location in Egypt
- Coordinates: 29°05′15″N 30°56′40″E
- Country: Egypt
- Governorate: Beni Suef

Population (2006)
  - Total: 40,001
- Time zone: UTC+2 (EET)
  - Summer (DST): UTC+3 (EEST)

Ihnasya (Arabic: إهناسيا) is a historical city in the Beni Suef Governorate of Egypt. It is located on the left bank of the Nile, close to the Bahr Yussef canal. Ihnasya, also known as Heracleopolis, served as the capital of the Heracleopolite nome in Ancient Egyptian, Ptolemaic, and Roman periods. Its importance persisted after the Muslim conquest of Egypt, as it became the capital of kurah al-Ihnasiyya.

Today, it serves as the center of a markaz with a total population of 295,919 people.

== Etymology ==
The modern Arabic name of the city is a nisba of an earlier name Ihnas (Arabic: إهناس), which comes from its Coptic name Ehnas (Coptic: ⲉϩⲛⲏⲥ) or Hnas (Coptic: ϩⲛⲏⲥ). It is ultimately derived from Henennesut (Ancient Egyptian: ḥw.t-nn-nzw, lit. 'temple of the child of the king'), but it is probably not the original etymology of the name, which remains obscure. This name was rendered as Anysis by Herodotus (Ancient Greek: 'Ανυσις).

The Greeks identified the city's chief god Heryshaf with Heracles, thus the Greek name of the city, Heracleopolis (Ancient Greek: Ἡρακλέους πόλις).

Tinnis, the now abandoned town in Lower Egypt, shares both its Egyptian and Greek names etymology with Ihnasyah.

== History ==
The city dates back to the mid First Dynasty around 2970 BC, as indicated by King Den's visit to the sacred lake of Heryshaf.

During the First Intermediate Period (2181–2055 BC), it became a prominent city in Middle Egypt, exercising control over the region after the collapse of the Old Kingdom, leading to its identification as the Herakleopolitan Period. Conflict with Thebes in Upper Egypt was common during this time.

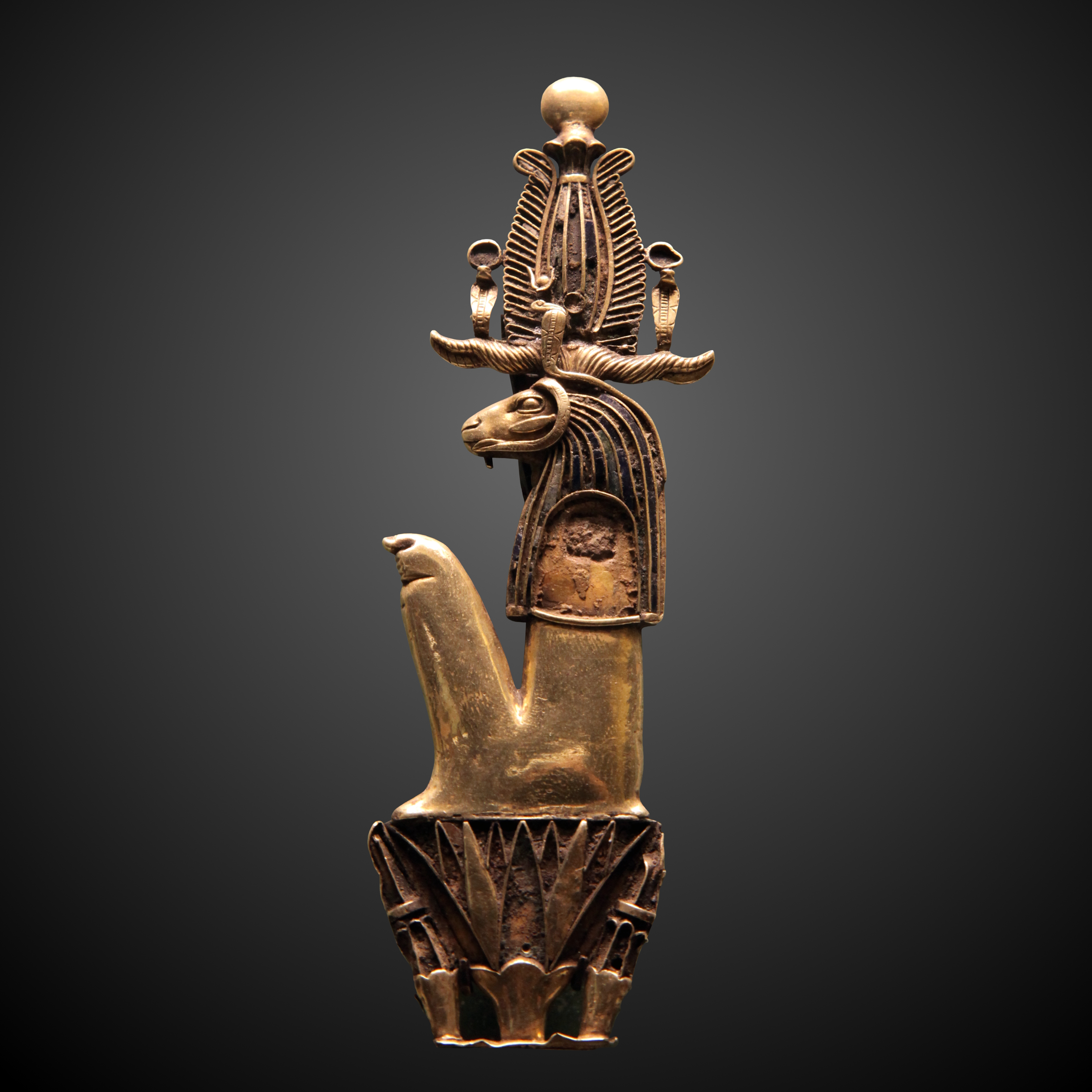
Heryshaf, the chief god of Ihnas

In the Middle Kingdom (2055–1650 BC), Ihnasya became the religious center of the Heryshaf cult, with the construction of the Temple of Heryshaf. It was defeated by Mentuhotep II around 2055–2004 BC, marking the start of the Middle Kingdom. During the Third Intermediate Period (1069–664 BC), Ihnasya regained importance with renovations and new constructions in the city, re-establishing itself as a religious and political center.

From the Saite period through the Roman era, Heracleopolis maintained its significance. In the 3rd century BC Manetho referred to it as the capital of the 9th and 10th dynasties, which he called Heracleopolitan. Ancient geographers like Strabo, Pliny the Elder, and Ptolemy mentioned Heracleopolis, often adding "Magna" to distinguish it from a smaller counterpart in the Delta. The city was also mentioned in later texts, such as the Tabula Peutingeriana and writings by Byzantine authors Hierocles, Stephen of Byzantium, and George of Cyprus.

Coins from the time of Trajan, Hadrian, and Antoninus depicted Hercules, further linking him with the city. The association of Harsaphes with Heracles may have become official during the Ptolemaic period.

Heracleopolis was crossed by the Roman road from Memphis to Upper Egypt, and it boasted walls, a Greek and an Egyptian agora, a gymnasium, baths, a hippodrome, and various temples, including those dedicated to Apollo, Chronos, Anubis, and Serapis. The primary temple was devoted to Harsaphes/Heracles and was last restored during Antoninus Pius's rule.

Ehnes played a crucial role in the Christian era, with legends of Mary and Jesus residing there, and Saint Eusebius martyred in the city, and another martyr, Saint Helias, became the patron saint of Ehnas. It was also home to numerous bishops, attending councils like Nicaea and Ephesus, continuing until the 14th century. The city prospered with churches, monasteries, and a renowned Coptic art school. Various foreign communities, including Hebrews and Palmyrians, lived there.

Following the Arab conquest, Byzantine officials remained for a time, with the last Greek document from Ihnasya dating to 820-821. However, the city's decline paralleled the waning of its Christian influence, becoming depopulated and in ruins by the 12th century, with no important Arab monuments.
