= New Beni Suef =

New Beni Suef بنى سويف الجديدة
- City
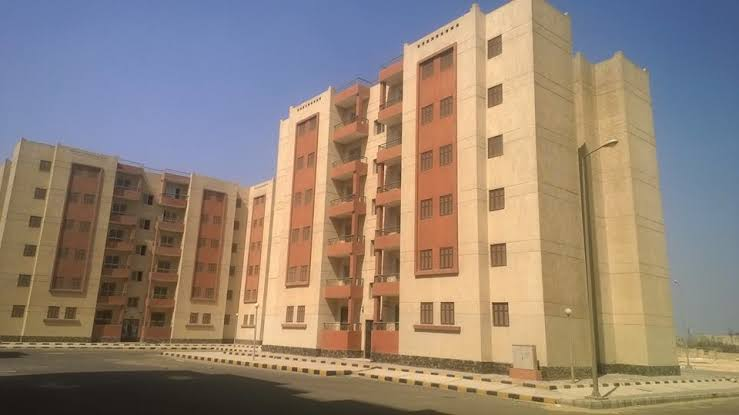
- Housing in New Beni Suef

- Location in Egypt
- Coordinates: 29.029561°N 31.102908°E
- Country: Egypt
- Governorate: Beni Suef

Area
  - Total: 267.6 km^{2} (103.3 sq mi)
- Elevation: 55 m (180 ft)

Population (2021)
  - Total: 32,278
  - Density: 120.6/km^{2} (312.4/sq mi)
- Time zone: UTC+2 (EET)
  - Summer (DST): UTC+3 (EEST)

New Beni Suef (Arabic: بنى سويف الجديدة) is a city in the Beni Suef Governorate, Egypt. The city is located east of Old Beni Suef and lies on the Nile River. The city was constructed by the New Urban Communities Authority. Its population was estimated at 31,000 people in 2020.
