= Dishasha =

Dishasha دشاشة
- Village
- Location in Egypt
- Coordinates: 28.983056°N 30.849167°E
- Country: Egypt
- Governorate: Beni Suef
- Time zone: UTC+2 (EST)

Dishasha (Deshasha) is a village and archaeological site in Beni Suef Governorate, Egypt, located on the west of the Nile. It contains a necropolis from the late Old Kingdom, including tombs belonging to the chief officials from the 20th nome. Flinders Petrie excavated the area in 1898 and recorded approximately 150 tombs.

The population was 11,844 in 2006.

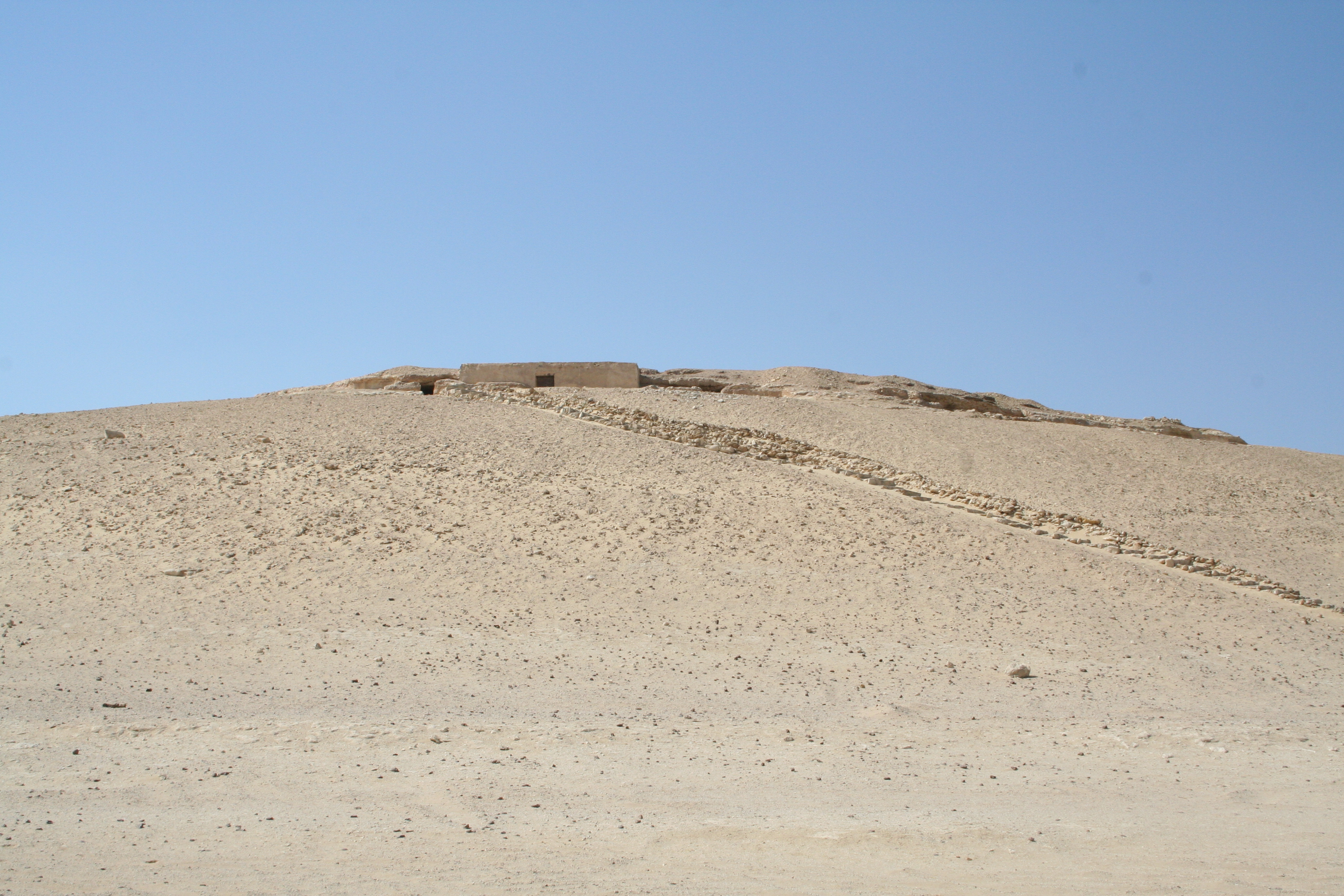
Necropolis of Dishasha from the late Old Kingdom

== See also ==
- Inti (Ancient Egyptian official)
- Shedu (ancient Egyptian official)
- Nenkhefetkai
