= Shedu (ancient Egyptian official) =

Ancient Egyptian provincial official

- Overseer of fields
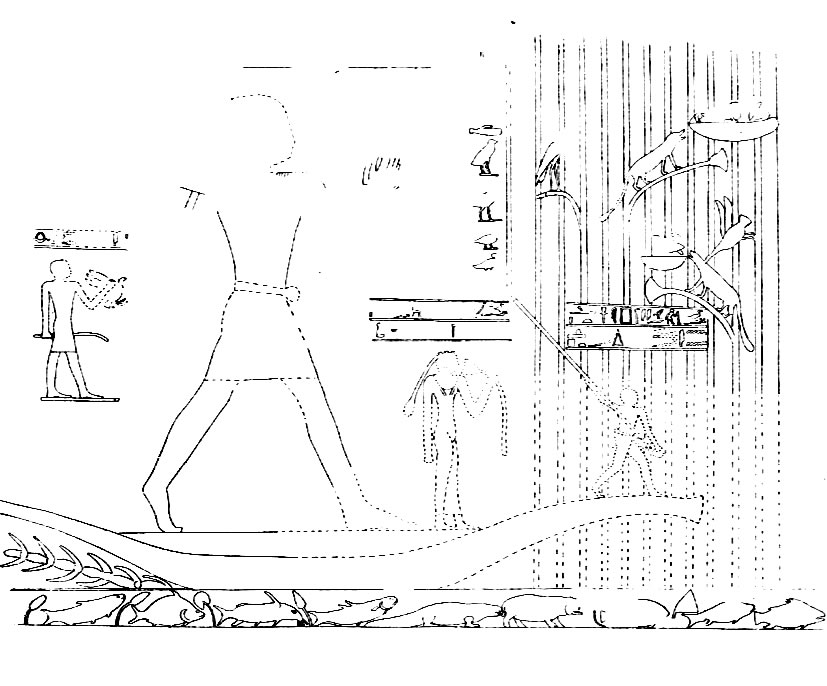
- Shedu waterfowl hunting
- Tenure: c. 2200 BC
- Burial: Dishasha, Beni Suef, Egypt
- Spouse: Henti
- Children: Neni, Khaensobek, and Mery

Shedu also called Iteti (fl. c. 2200 BC) was an ancient Egyptian provincial official who lived at the end of the 6th Dynasty and who is known from his rock-cut tomb at Dishasha.

Shedu is known from his relief decorated tomb chapel at Dishasha (in Middle Egypt), where several of his titles are mentioned. To those titles belong overseer of fields, overseer of all fresh vegetation, overseer of disputes and leader of the two great cities of the province. His wife Henti and his sons Neni, Khaensobek, as well as the daughter Mery are mentioned in the tomb decoration too.

The tomb of Shedu consists of a decorated chapel and several shafts going down to undecorated tomb chambers. The reliefs in the chapel are not well preserved. They show Shedu and in front of workmen and in front of an offering table. There are several daily life scenes showing peasants working for Shedu such as cattle breeding or the harvest of fruits. On the south wall, Shedu is depicted as hunting birds in the marshes.

The tomb was first recorded and later published under Flinders Petrie. From 1991 to 1993, an Australian team of Egyptologists under Naguib Kanawati went back to Dishasha and recorded and published the tombs there again.

== Literature ==
- Naguib Kanawati & Ann McFarlane (1993), with contributions by Nabil Charoubim, Naguib Victor and A. Salamaː Deshasha: The Tombs of Inti, Shedu and Others, (Sydney). ISBN 0-85668-617-4, pp. 39-63, plates 14-21, 40-57
- Flinders Petrie (1898)ː Deshasheh, 1897, With a chapter by F. L1. Griffith. EEF Memoir online
