= The Daughters of St. Mary =

Coptic community of nuns based in Beni Suef, Egypt

The Daughters of St. Mary (Deir Banat Maryam) is a Coptic community of nuns based in Beni Suef, Egypt.

== History ==
Bishop Athanasius founded The Daughters of St. Mary during the feast of the Holy Cross (March 19, 1965) with the blessing of then Patriarch Kyrillos VI, and initiated their first women in 1970. In 1974, a new facility was built, creating outreach programs for the poor, the elderly, orphans, and mentally handicapped individuals. Since then, the community has expanded their operation to Cairo, Mukattam, and Turah. Bishop Athanasius oversaw the nuns until his death on 16 November 2000.

== Social Works ==
The Daughters of St. Mary run several social projects as form of khedma, which in a Coptic context means “service as an act for God." Their services include “clinics and mobile clinics, nurseries, elementary schools, schools for vocational training, a crafts center, and projects for the mentally [handicapped], for elderly people who are physically or mentally disabled, and for young women and men." The nuns gear their social servers toward the disadvantaged groups within Egyptian society. For example, their medical facilities are often less expensive than government sponsored facilities, and the nuns provide better care for their patients. Furthermore, their services often reach groups marginalized by social taboos, such as mentally handicapped children who cannot find adequate care in Beni Suef.

== Differences From Other Coptic Nuns ==
The goal of The Daughters of St. Mary is to practice monasticism while serving the Coptic community by combating poverty, sickness, and furthering social justice. Their community service allows the nuns to interact with the secular world, unlike other Coptic nuns, who spend most of their time cloistered in convents, praying for the world. Their dress is less constricting then other Coptic nuns, which allows them maneuverability to carry out their social projects. Their clothes are also gray rather than black, to symbolize their participation in the secular world. Although called nuns - the Daughters of St. Mary are officially Deaconesses, and are usually called 'Tasooni' - which means sister in Coptic.

== See also ==
- Coptic Orthodox Church
- List of Copts
- Mother Irini
