= Metropolitan Athanasius =

Metropolitan Athanasius may refer to:

- Athanasius, Metropolitan of Moscow in 1564–1566
- Athanasius, Metropolitan of Beni Suef in 1962–2000
