= Pathways to Higher Education, Egypt =

Pathways to Higher Education (PHE/EG) is a soft-skills oriented training program funded by Ford Foundation in fourteen different countries across the globe, and implemented in Egypt by Cairo University represented by CAPSCU in three phases over a period of ten years, starting 2002 through 2012. The main objectives of PHE/EG is to enhance the skills of socially disadvantaged (underprivileged) groups among the university students and graduates, focusing on students and graduates of humanities and social sciences specializations preserving gender equal opportunity, with a primary view to improving their chances of access to postgraduate studies, enhancing their prospects to benefit from any scholarships programs, and/or maximizing their potential for acquiring better employment opportunities. These developmental issues are in-line with the overall objectives and reform strategy of the Egyptian Ministry of Higher Education (MOHE) that is being implemented in phases by the Projects Management Unit (PMU/MOHE). To achieve an effective outreach, CAPSCU established partnerships with counterpart stakeholders concerned with skills-oriented human resources capacity building. One of the partners is the Social Fund for Development (SFD)] a government funding mechanism that provides support for graduates to start their own businesses. In addition, the main beneficiaries are the ten Egyptian public universities participating in Phase-I & Phase-II of the PHE/EG project, namely Cairo, Ain-Shams, Assiut, Helwan, Minia, South Valley, Fayoum, Beni-Suef, Benha and Suhag, as well as the remaining eight of the existing eighteen public universities that will participate in Phase-III, namely, Alexandria, Mansoura, Zagazig, Menoufia, Tanta, Suez Canal, Kafr El-Sheikh, Port Said and Damanhoor. The Management Team of PHE/EG project established a management network infrastructure/mechanism that allows for the concurrent implementation of the PHE/EG training programs in all public universities, biannually during mid-term and summer holidays. This entails having a project coordinator in each university working closely with the PHE/EG management team to cater for all logistical matters for running the training programs , including; interviews of applicants that meet the preliminary online screening criteria, providing them with automated online assessment tests and selecting the successful applicants for the training programs. In addition, project coordinators, being senior faculty members in their respective universities, were able to provide job opportunities to some of the distinguished trainees.

== Pathways Partners ==
- Cairo University
- Ain Shams University
- Assiut University
- University of Helwan
- Minia University
- University of South Valley
- Fayoum University
- University of Beni Suef
- University of Banha
- University of Sohag
- Alexandria University
- Tanta University
- Mansoura University
- Zagazig University
- Minufiya University
- Suez Canal University
- Kafr El-Sheikh University
- Port Said University
- Damanhour University
- Aswan University
- Azhar University

The project coordinators in universities and the govererates

- Prof. Magdy Mahmoud Bahgat Otaiba, professor at the Faculty of Engineering and former Vice Dean - Fayoum University
- Prof. Ola Ibrahim Hamouda, professor at the Faculty of Science and former Vice Dean - University of Beni Suef
- Prof. Azza Mohammed Ahmed Salam professor at the Faculty of Education and former Vice Dean - Minia University
- Prof. Osama Sayed Mohamed, assistant professor, Faculty of Engineering - Assiut University
- Prof. Ahmed Khatib, director of the Center for Quality Assurance and professor at the Faculty of Science - Sohag University
- Prof. Sayed Omar Mohamed Dean of the Faculty of Science, Qena - South Valley University
- Prof. Abdullah Ahmad Ibrahim al-Dean of the Faculty of Engineering - University of the South Valley, Aswan Governorate Coordinator
- Prof. Abdo Mahdi Mohammed Mahdi and Deputy Dean of Faculty of Agriculture - Benha University
- Prof. Amr Soliman Ass. professor of economics and director of the centre of quality assurance, Faculty of commerce & Business Administration - Helwan University

The performance of PHE/EG project has been recently assessed during the final stages of the implementation of Phase-II by a professional external evaluator commissioned through the Ford Foundation Headquarters office in New York City, over a prolonged period of time following TQM methodology, to ensure that the project has achieved its developmental objectives. The outcome of the assessment was the approval of the Ford Foundation Headquarters to continue funding Phase-III of the project, with Egypt being at the forefront of only four countries, out of the fourteen, selected to continue implementation reaching an aggregate period of ten years, which the longest period of any project funded by the foundation.

== PHE/EG Training Programs ==
PHE/EG training programs developed during the Phase-I of the project had continuous and periodic revisions based on training outcomes. Monitoring and evaluation processes include feedback from trainees, trainers, steering committee and experts. This element of flexibility has proved to be instrumental in the enhancement of training quality, management and coordination. Complete details about the project achievements in Phase-I and Phase-II are hosted on Pathways website: http://www.pathways.cu.edu.eg/ The following training programs were developed and implemented since the startup of project implementation in September 2002:

- BBSA Basic Business Skills Acquisition,
- ERS Enhancement of Research Skills,
- DTMS Development of Thinking and Managerial Skills,
- ETS Enhancement of Teaching Skills,
- DLS Development of Leadership Skills,
- TOT Training of Trainers, and
- CC Training program in computer or English (CC) or other elective subject offered to outstanding students

By the end of Phase-II, the project was able to develop the capacity of 880 trainers, mainly faculty members from the participating universities, and to commission them to train 14537 trainees in 25 training programs conducted in 171 training batches, and to develop and disseminate 39 books in Arabic and English, both in hard and electronically published soft copies. The materials used in thirteen training programs were internationally certified by the ICBT (International Board of Certified Trainers) through its newly established branch in Egypt NCFLD (National Center for Faculty Leadership Development) that is responsible for the certification process in the MENA (Middle East and North Africa) region. The materials used in the rest of the training programs are in the pipeline of being internationally certified as well.

The following table shows the project trainees in seven different programs according to their respective universities. Nearly 80% of the trainees are from humanities and social sciences specializations, with almost half of which (49.7%) are females.

University	BBSA	ERS	TOT	DLS	DTMS	ETS	CL	Total	-
Cairo	1440	329	94	78	894	1	33	2824	19.43%
Ain Shams	40	83	14	18	85	1	2	243	1.67%
Helwan	40	68	39	15	794	-	2	958	6.59%
South Valley, (Qena, Luxor, Hurghada])	-	2	109	10	3257	1	105	3484	23.97%
Fayoum	-	-	72	2	839	-	23	931	6.40%
Minia	-	3	51	3	1176	94	56	1383	9.51%
Assiut	-	3	84	3	1359	1	1	1450	9.97%
Beni Suef]	-	-	40	23	1408	-	45	1516	10.43%
Sohag]	-	-	35	8	963	-	8	1014	6.98%
Benha]	-	-	23	1	281	-	0	305	2.10%
Other educational institutes	80	82	31	23	203	3	7	429	2.95%
Total	1600	569	592	184	11209	101	282	14537	100%
Percentage	11.01%	3.91%	4.07%	1.27%	77.11%	0.69%	1.94%	100%	

Also, the following graph shows the Development of Pathways graduates. ERS program was implemented for three years (2003–2005), and DTMS program was implemented only in each winter and summer since 2006 (winter is a short period of time, two weeks of mid-year holiday; summer vacation is almost 3 months).

Moreover, the project publications became 39 books used as educational training material. Several pilot attempts to introduce some of the skills-oriented training into the regular undergraduate programs in the participating universities were successfully implemented. The PHE steering committee including Presidents of the 10 participating universities out of the 18 public universities existing in Egypt, agreed to consider this issue a priority in their universities and to bring it to the attention of the Supreme Council of Universities (SCU), in line with the MOHE directives to reform higher education in Egypt.

The project established TOT programs to create a network of trainers, authors, monitors, evaluators, consultants, coordinators and administrative staff all over Egypt totaling 888 persons/experts. The project extended its activities to include 13 different governorates each of them has its own training facilities. Pathways websites help the underrepresented population in remote areas to access the training materials through the Internet. Free access of all Pathways training material, publications and reports are hosted in www.pathways.cu.edu.e.g. website in the training publications sub-menu. Another website was established as a central platform for trainees’ activities and communications (www.Pathways-news.com). Decentralized websites dedicated for PHE/EG were also established in each participating public university and linked in a network with the central website.

Strengthening capacity, core and democratic values between the trainees are among the by-products of the PHE training program. These values help trainees to develop their personalities, human rights capacities, increase their self-esteem, accept opinions of others, etc., through activities that encourage trainees to; elect a class coordinator through free election, evaluation of trainers, training venue, training facilities and PHE/EG management team, as well as self and peer assessment (the feedback is analyzed and continual development and amendment takes place). In addition, trainees are allowed to select the training approach that meets their needs (managerial, behavioral or knowledge), to suggest topics for the general lectures delivered during the training program (becomes part of a database for topics from which the general lectures are chosen), to organize some social activities together, and to plan and implement the final full-day ceremonial workshop that takes place at the end of each training program, with individual and/or group contributions of trainees to reflect critically on the outcome of their training.

== Funding of the PHE/EG ==
The PHE/EG project is funded in three phases with an aggregate budget of 3.91 million US$. Phase-I was implemented in three years with a budget of 800,000 US$, followed by an intermediate phase implemented of one and half year in preparation for Phase-II with a budget of 410,000 US$. Phase-II of the PHE/EG implementation was prolonged to three and half years with a budget 1.2 million US$ from Ford Foundation because of the cost-sharing policy adopted by the PHE/EG Steering Committee to have universities share 50% of the direct training cost, reaching an aggregate of 1.5 million L.E., including contributions from project partners SFD and NCW, in a transition to have universities bear the total cost of training after the termination of project funds (a sustainability challenge). Phase-III is planned to be implemented over the coming two years with a total allocated budget of 1.5 million US$.

== Future Plans ==
- Phase-III of the PHE/EG will witness a new training program for English Language skills improvement in cooperation with University of Cambridge, and in consortium with the British Council. The aim of this training component is to develop students' quality market relevant English language skills that are integrated in a blended face-to-face/online learning package combined with the soft skills training programs that has already been developed and offered successfully through the PHE/EG project over the past eight years. In order to enhance the skills and employment chances of graduates on the national, regional and global levels, and to provide a scalable pilot that can be mainstreamed to reform English language instruction in Egyptian universities and higher education institutions, the program offered is aligned with the internationally recognized Common European Framework (CEFR) as the underlying framework for the graduates to become internationally certifiable.
- Phase-III will also witness the development and implementation of a new soft skills-oriented training program to promote entrepreneurial skills and human rights among students and graduates with the objective to enhance/change their mind-set towards the concept of creating job opportunities for themselves, injecting calculated risk-taking concepts, innovative and creative thinking, and furthering the limited government capacity to provide sufficient employment opportunities for the graduates, and the human resource capital at large.
- By the end of Phase-III, the sustainability of PHE/EG will be secured in all Egyptian public universities participating in the project through their ownership of the training infrastructure already established by PHE/EG (internationally certified training materials, critical mass of TOTs, human resources trained, assessment and evaluation mechanisms at all levels, fully integrated PHE/EG website containing relevant databases, online admissions, assessment mechanisms, procedures and guidelines, all networked with the corresponding websites developed in every public university, etc.). The implementation of PHE/EG in all Egyptian universities over the past eight years, and the involvement of their leadership in the Steering Committee of the project, led to their commitment to continue supporting the project implementation in their respective universities, utilizing the well-established infrastructure and nurturing its continued development and improvement to keep offering their students the soft skills-oriented training needed to support Egypt’s human resources development strategy.
- Pathways Training Programs:Pathways established and developed training material for 25 training programs; these include books, power point presentations or trainee/trainer manuals. Most of these training materials are available in both Arabic and English languages.

== Development of Thinking and Managerial Skills (DTMS) ==
The Trainee can select one of the following approaches. Each approach is conducted over two weeks (75 training hrs).

Managerial Approach (MA)*

- Problem Solving and Decision Making
- Teams and Work Groups
- Negotiation Skills
- Economic Feasibility Studies
- Basics of Managerial Economics
- Planning and Controlling

Behavioral Approach (BA)*

- Analytical Thinking
- Systems and Creative Thinking
- Argumentation: Techniques of Measurement and Development
- Stress Management
- Communication Skills
- Research Methods and Writing Research Proposals

Knowledge Approach (KA)*

- Statistical Data Analysis]
- Risk Assessment and Risk Management
- Wellness Guide Lines (Healthful Life)
- Basic Arabic Language Skills for Scientific Writing
- Accounting for Management and Decision Making
- Small Projects: Opportunities and Challenges

== Pathways Special Training Programs (PSTP) ==
The Trainee can select one of the following programs. The first two programs are conducted over one week (35 training hrs). The rest of the programs have its own schedule/length.

- Training of Trainers (TOT)
- Development of Leadership Skills (DLS)
- Enhancement of Research Skills (ERS)
- Enhancement of Teaching Skills (ETS)
- Development of English Skills (DES)

Moreover, the project publications became 39 books used as educational training material. The project established a network for the trainers, authors, monitors, evaluators, consultants, coordinators and administrative staff all over Egypt with total volume of 880 experts. The project extended its activities to include 13 different governorates each of them has its own training facilities.

== Pathways around the World ==
The Ford Foundation's Pathways to Higher Education initiative supports 91 higher education institutions located in 22 countries to transform policies, classroom practices, curricula, daily operations and institutional climate so that a greater number of students from marginalized groups enter and graduate with undergraduate degrees. These countries include:
Argentina, Brazil, Chile, China, Colombia, Costa Rica, Egypt, Guatemala, India, Indonesia, Kenya, Mexico, Namibia, Nicaragua, Nigeria, Peru, Philippines, Russia, South Africa, Tanzania, Uganda, Vietnam.

The Pathways to Higher Education initiative takes a unique shape in each country because the cultural contexts of marginalized peoples, while linked by the common experiences of exclusion, are distinct. Therefore, the approaches vary in each country depending on its particular needs.

== Sources and References ==
Main Website
