= Coptic monasticism =

Coptic way of life claiming to be the original form of monasticism

Coptic monasticism is a voluntary Christian spiritual way of life that originated early on in Christian history within the Coptic Orthodox Church and which is still practiced today. It aims to permit a deeper connection with God through asceticism, hard work, detachment from material things, and a life of prayer free from external distractions.

It is said to be the original form of monasticism. Anthony the Great became the first one to be called "monk" (Ancient Greek: μοναχός), and was the first to establish a Christian monastery—now known as the Monastery of Saint Anthony at the base of Mount Colzim.

The Monastery of Saint Anthony is the oldest Christian monastery in the world.

Although Anthony's way of life was focused on solidarity, Pachomius the Great, a Copt from Upper Egypt, established cenobitic monasticism in his monasteries in Upper Egypt, which laid the basic monastic structure for many of the monasteries today in many monastic orders even outside of Coptic Orthodoxy.

== Origins ==
Institutional Christian monasticism seems to have begun in the deserts in fourth century Egypt as a kind of living martyrdom. Scholars such as Lester K. Little attribute the rise of monasticism at this time to the immense changes in the church that had been brought about by Constantine the Great's acceptance of Christianity as the main religion of the Roman Empire. This ended the position of Christians as a small group that believed itself to be the godly elite. In response a new more advanced form of dedication was developed to preserve a nucleus of the dedicated. The end of persecution also meant that martyrdom was no longer an option to prove one's piety. Instead the long-term "martyrdom" of the ascetic became common.

Many Egyptian Christians went to the desert during the third century, and remained there to pray and work and dedicate their lives to seclusion and worship of God. This was the beginning of the monastic movement, which was organized by Anthony, the world's first anchorite Macarius of Alexandria, and Pachomius in the fourth century.

=== Pachomius ===
Pachomius established his first monastery between 318 and 323 at Tabenna, Egypt, and when it grew too large, his second one, Pbow, was built in Fāw Qiblī. Pachomius spent most of his time at Pbow. By the time of his death in 345, one count estimates there were 3000 monasteries dotting Egypt from north to south. Within a generation after his death, this number grew to 7000 and then expanding out of Egypt into Palestine and the Judaean Desert, Syria, North Africa and eventually Western Europe.

== Monasticism ==
Christian monasticism originally developed largely in Egypt and became instrumental in the formation of the Coptic Orthodox Church character of submission, simplicity and humility, thanks to the teachings and writings of the Great Fathers of Egypt's deserts. By the end of the 5th century hundreds of monasteries and thousands of monastic cells and caves existed, scattered throughout the Egyptian desert. A great number of these monasteries continue to flourish and to attract new vocations to this day.

Traditionally, all Christian monasticism stems, either directly or indirectly, from the Egyptian example: Saint Basil the Great Archbishop of Caesaria of Cappadocia, founder and organizer of the monastic movement in Asia Minor, visited Egypt around 357 AD and his rule is followed by the Eastern Orthodox Churches; Saint Jerome who translated the Bible into Latin, came to Egypt, while en route to Jerusalem, around 400 AD and left details of his experiences in his letters; Benedict founded the Benedictine Order in the 6th century on the model of Saint Pachomius, but in a stricter form. Countless pilgrims have looked to the "Desert Fathers" with a view to emulating their spiritual, disciplined lives.

Coptic monasticism took three forms:

- Monachism
- The coenobitic system
- The communal system or semi-eremitic life

== Modern status ==
The Coptic Orthodox Church has many monasteries and convents that host many monks and nuns. All of the Coptic bishops are chosen from monks, although this was not necessary traditionally.

Coptic monasticism saw a revival that started in the 1960s during the papacy of Pope Cyril VI of Alexandria, and currently there are Coptic monasteries and convents in Egypt, the United States, Canada, Australia and Europe that have been recognized by the Holy Synod of the Coptic Orthodox Church.

There are currently 33 monasteries in Egypt and in the lands of the immigration with a total of more than 1,000 monks, and six convents with about 300 nuns. The largest monasteries, and most famous, are at Wadi Natrun, about 60 miles northwest of Cairo. They are the only four of the ancient fortified self-sufficient monasteries which have survived out of many that were in the Wadi Natroun valley.

== Degrees of monasticism ==
There are only two degrees of professed monks. These correspond to the Rassaphore combined with the Stavrophore of Eastern Orthodox tradition, and the Great Schema (nothing equivalent to separate Stavrophore status in the Coptic tradition).

The two rites of Rasaphore and Stavrophore are served one immediately following the other, as a single service. In the 21st century, they are usually not separated by several years between attainment of these degrees. When the two rites are separated, the portions of the habit that were given in the previous rite are not given a second time in the latter rite.

The Great Schema is made of a leather cord twisted in design and has five to seven small crosses along its length. It is worn crosswise around the neck, flowing down cross wise front and back. It is usually granted to bishops either upon their episcopal consecration or shortly afterwards. It is also usually granted to a monk who has reached a high degree of asceticism or has been living as a hermit. It may also be granted to the monks, hieromonks, and abbots who have been in the monastic life for more than 30 years, and have been living exemplary monastic lives.

== Image gallery ==
Coptic monasteries

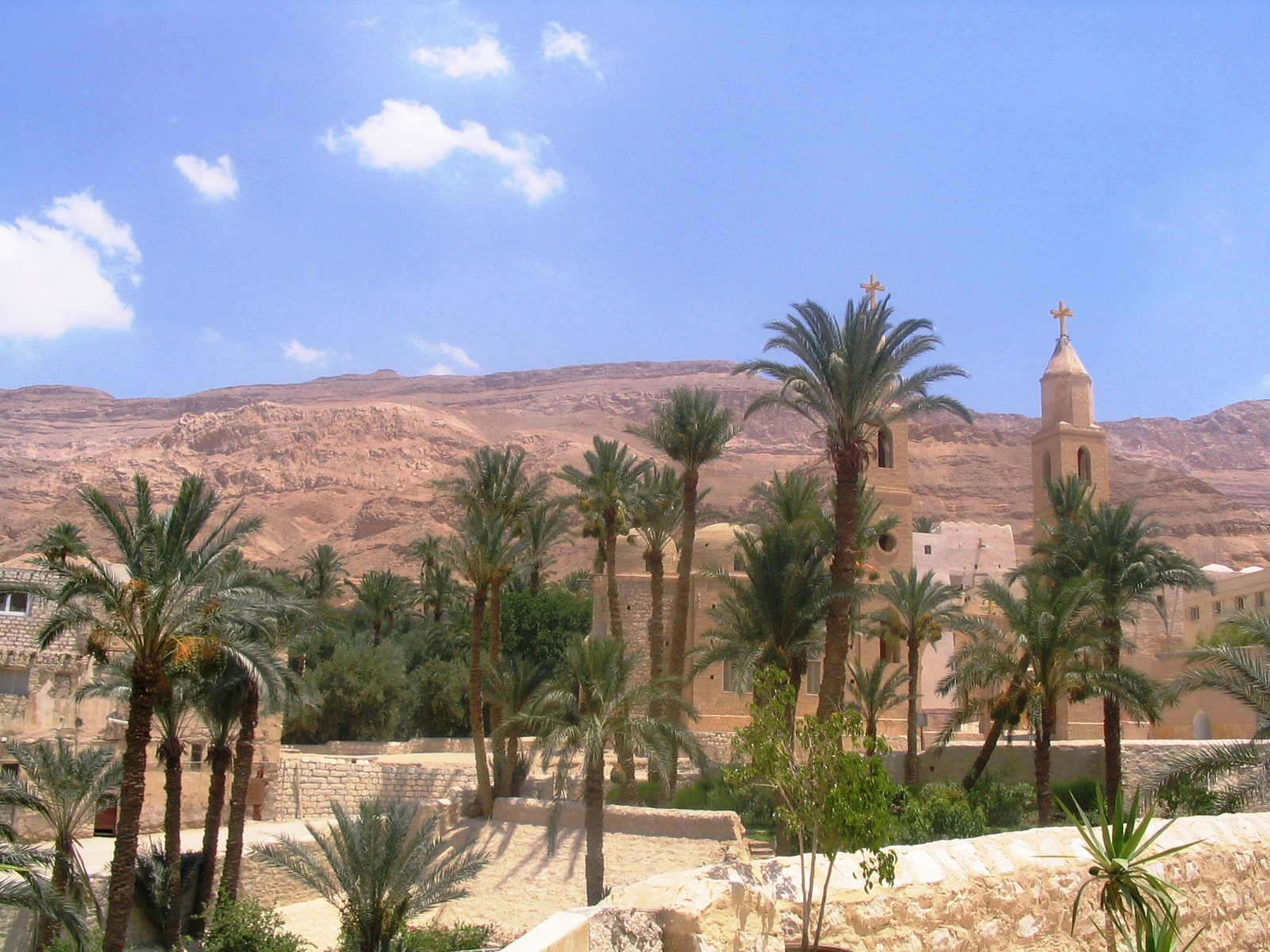
Monastery of Saint Anthony, Eastern Desert, Egypt

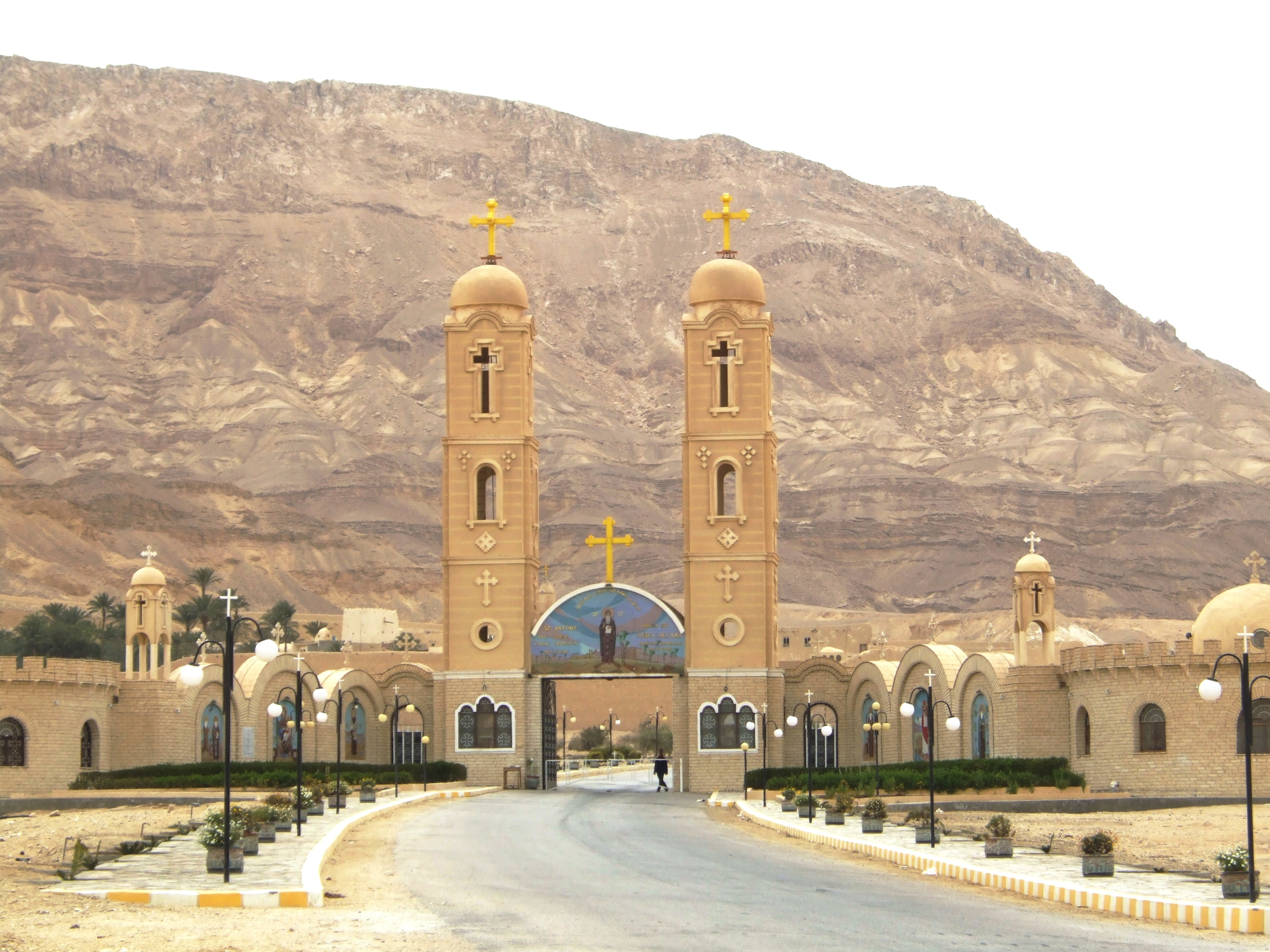
Monastery of Saint Anthony, Eastern Desert near Mount Colzim, Egypt

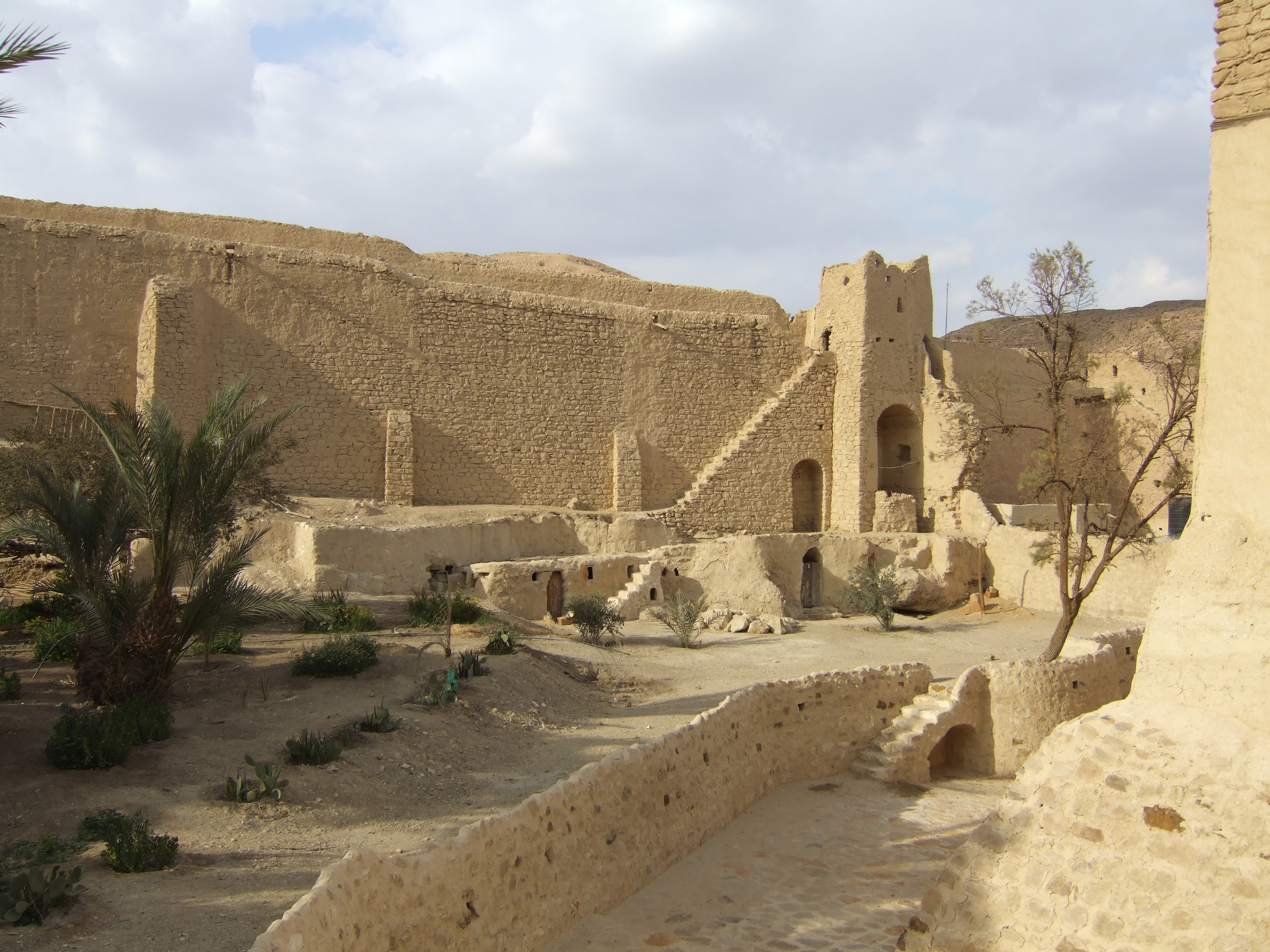
Monastery of Saint Paul the Anchorite, Eastern Desert, Egypt

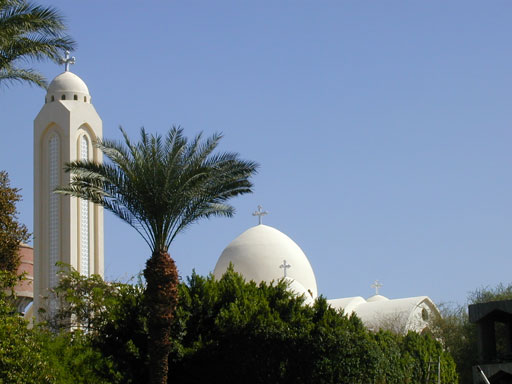
Coptic Monastery in Scetes, Egypt

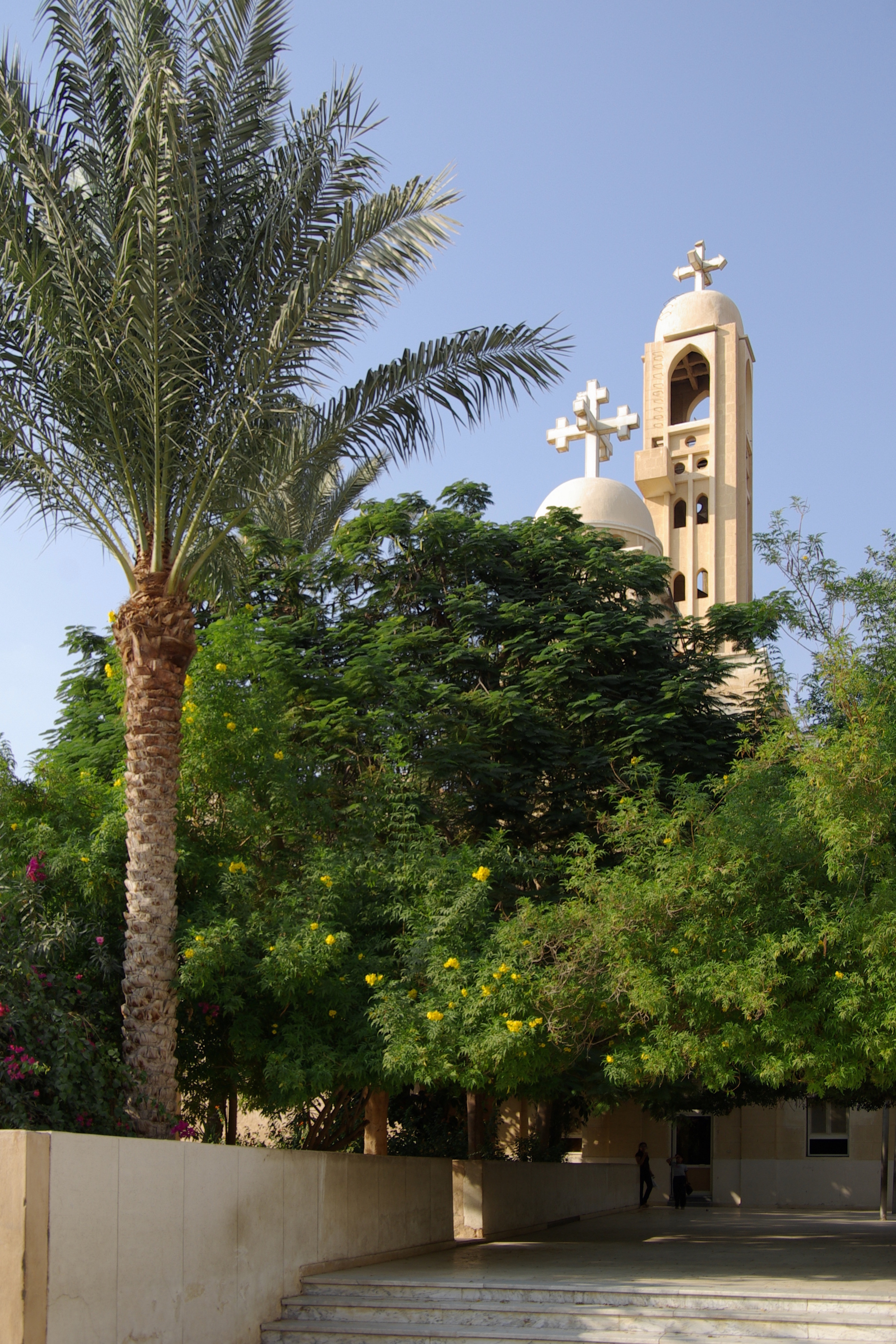
Monastery of Saint Pishoy, Scetes, Egypt

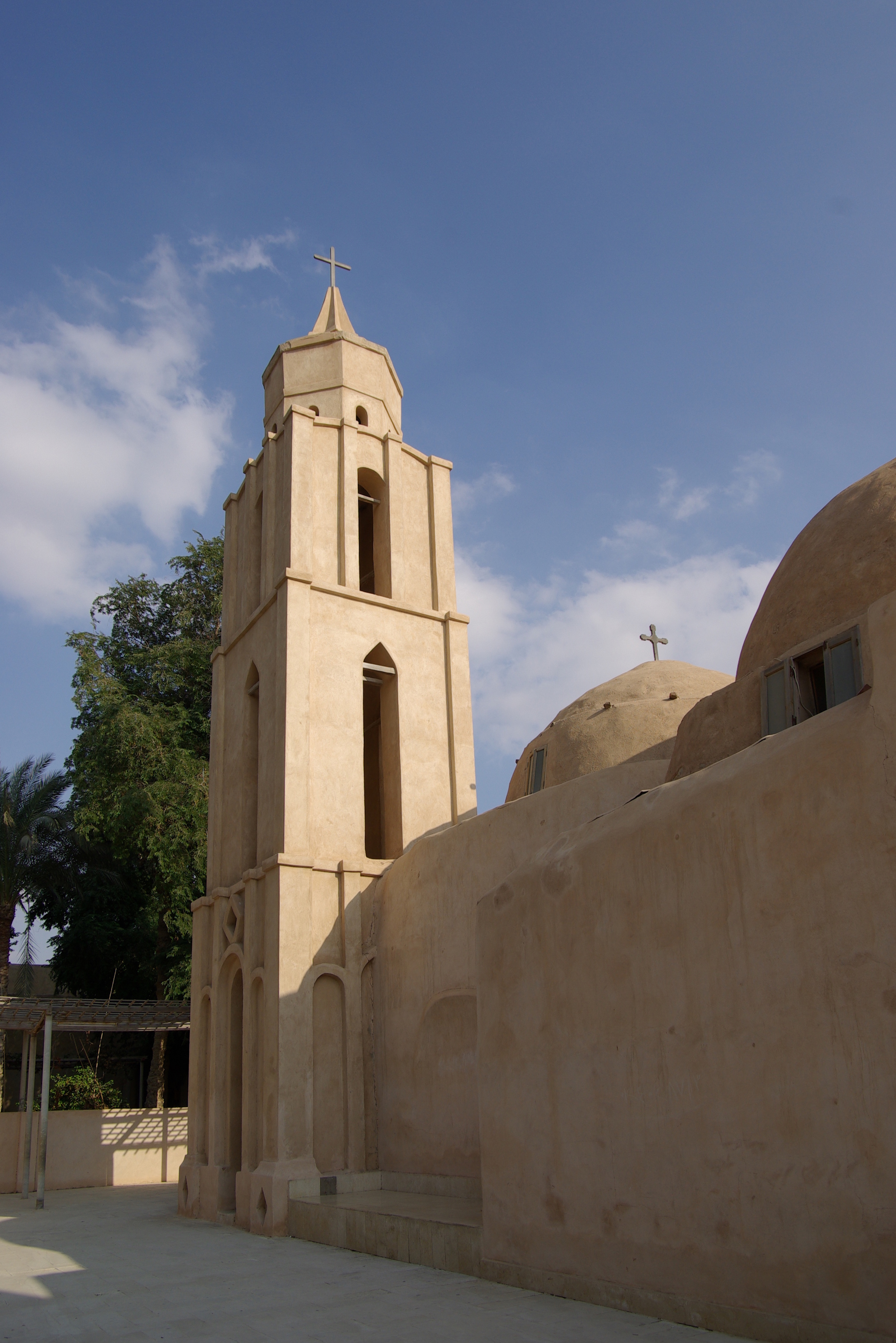
Monastery of Saint Pishoy, Scetes, Egypt

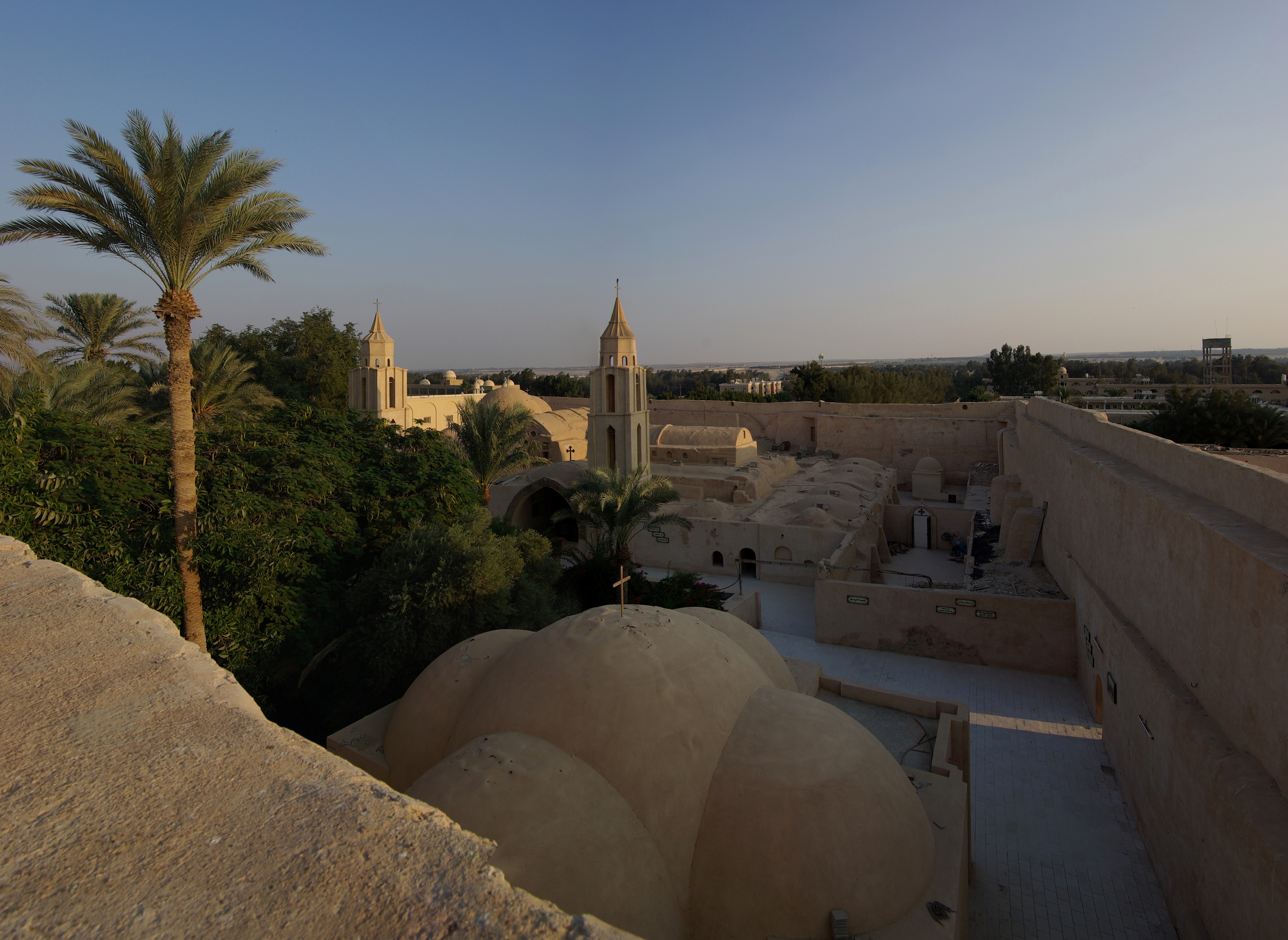
Monastery of Saint Pishoy, Scetes, Egypt

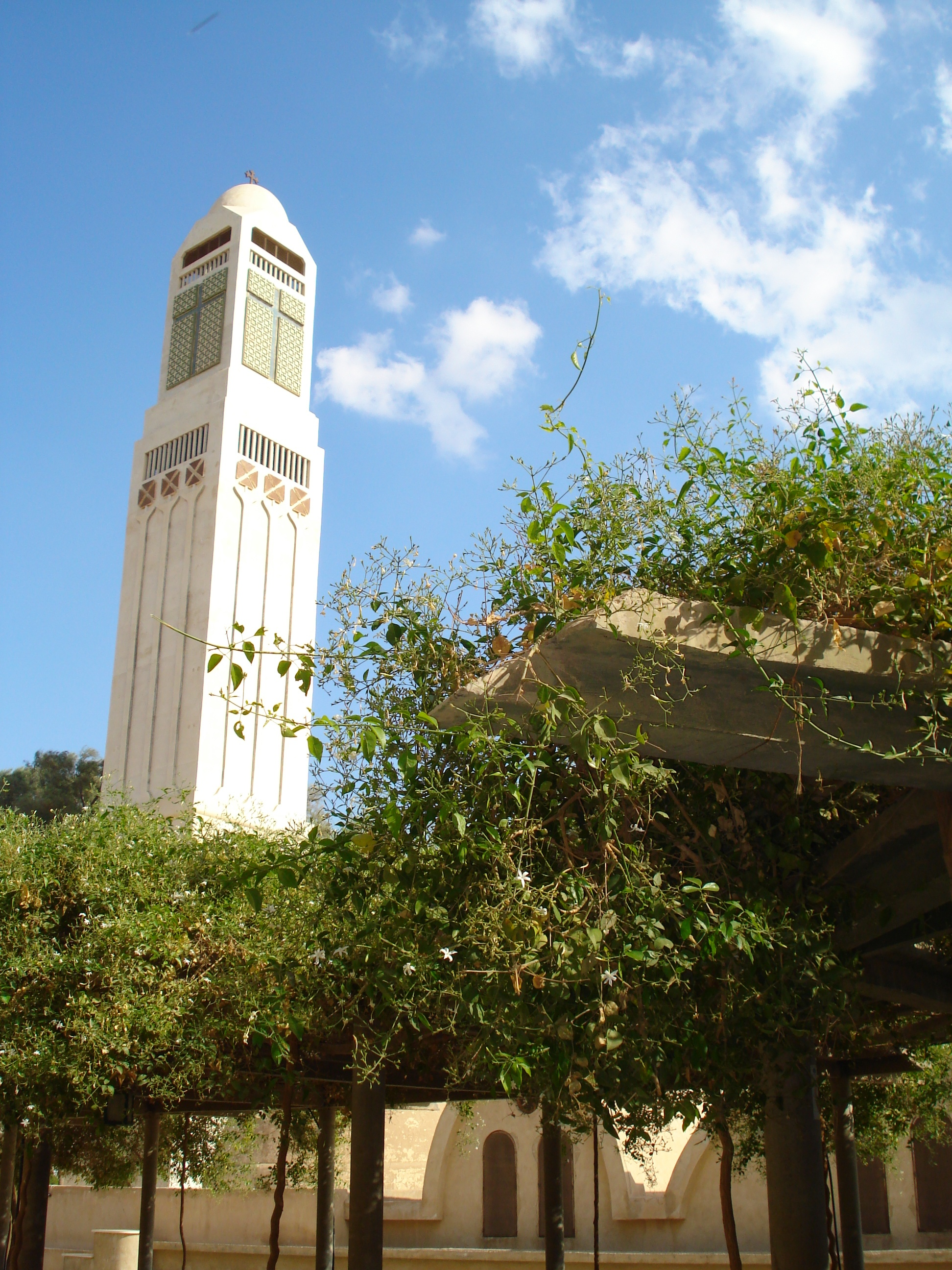
Monastery of Saint Macarius the Great, Scetes, Egypt

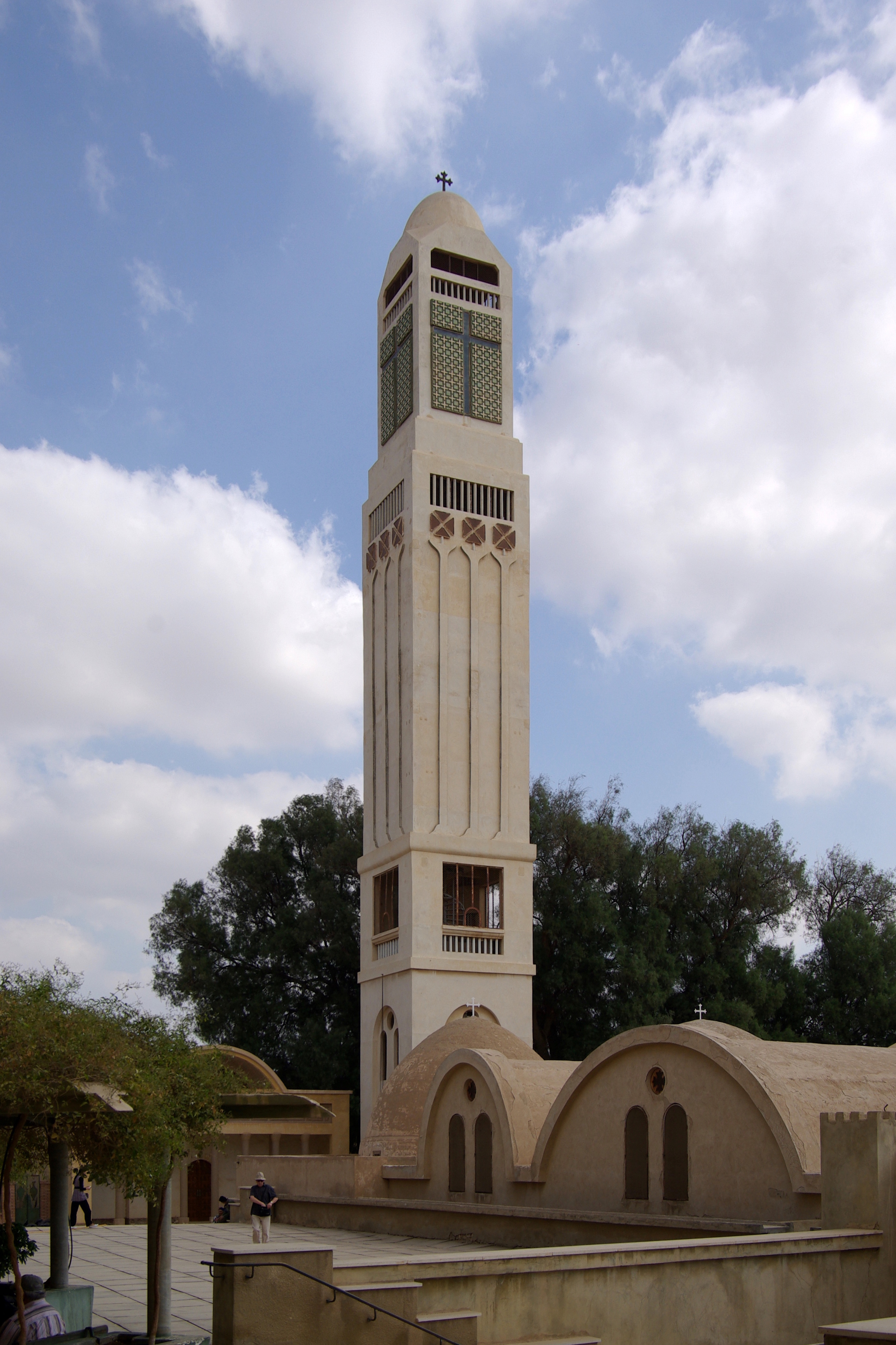
Monastery of Saint Macarius the Great, Scetes, Egypt

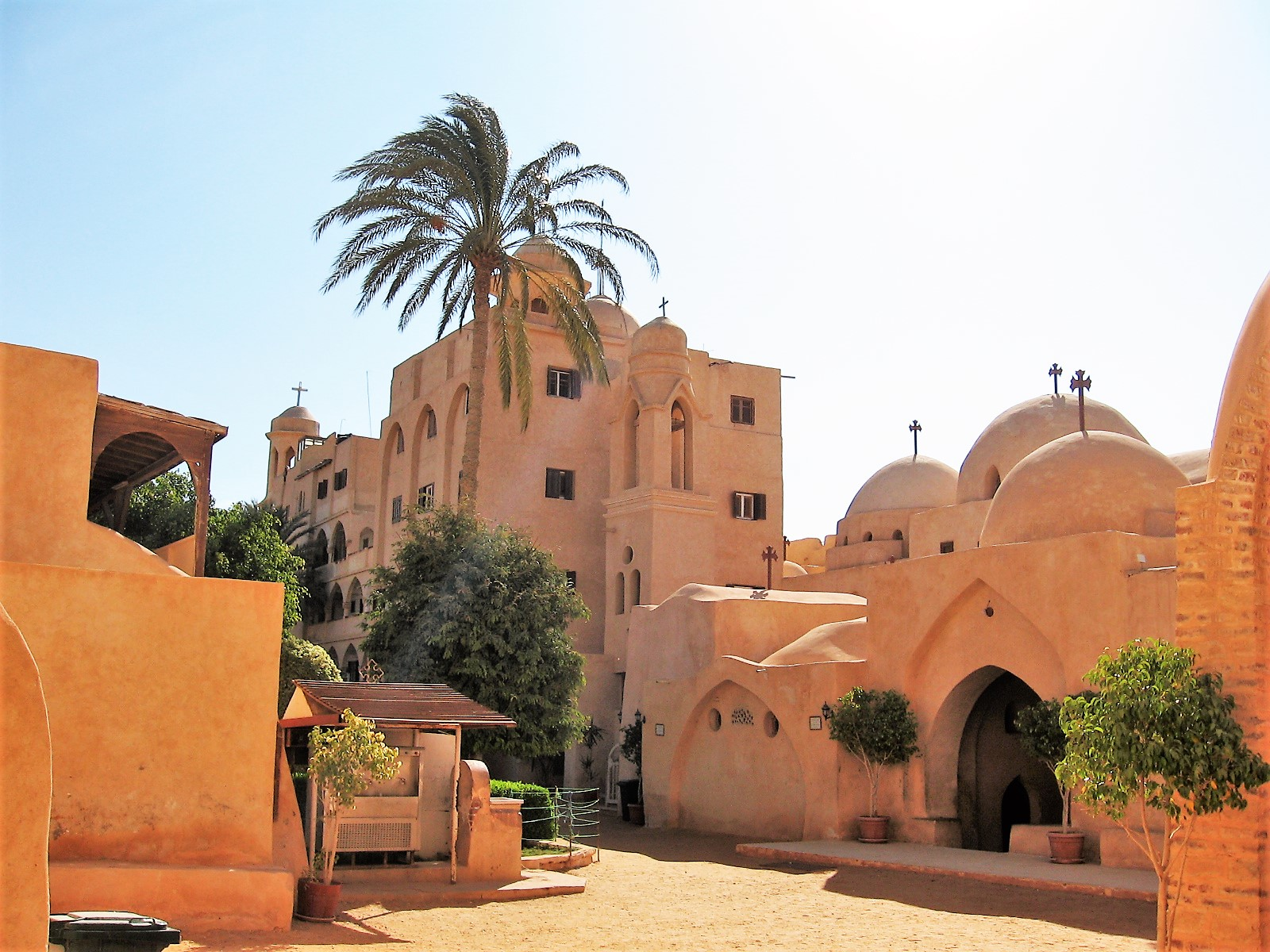
Syrian Monastery, Scetes, Egypt

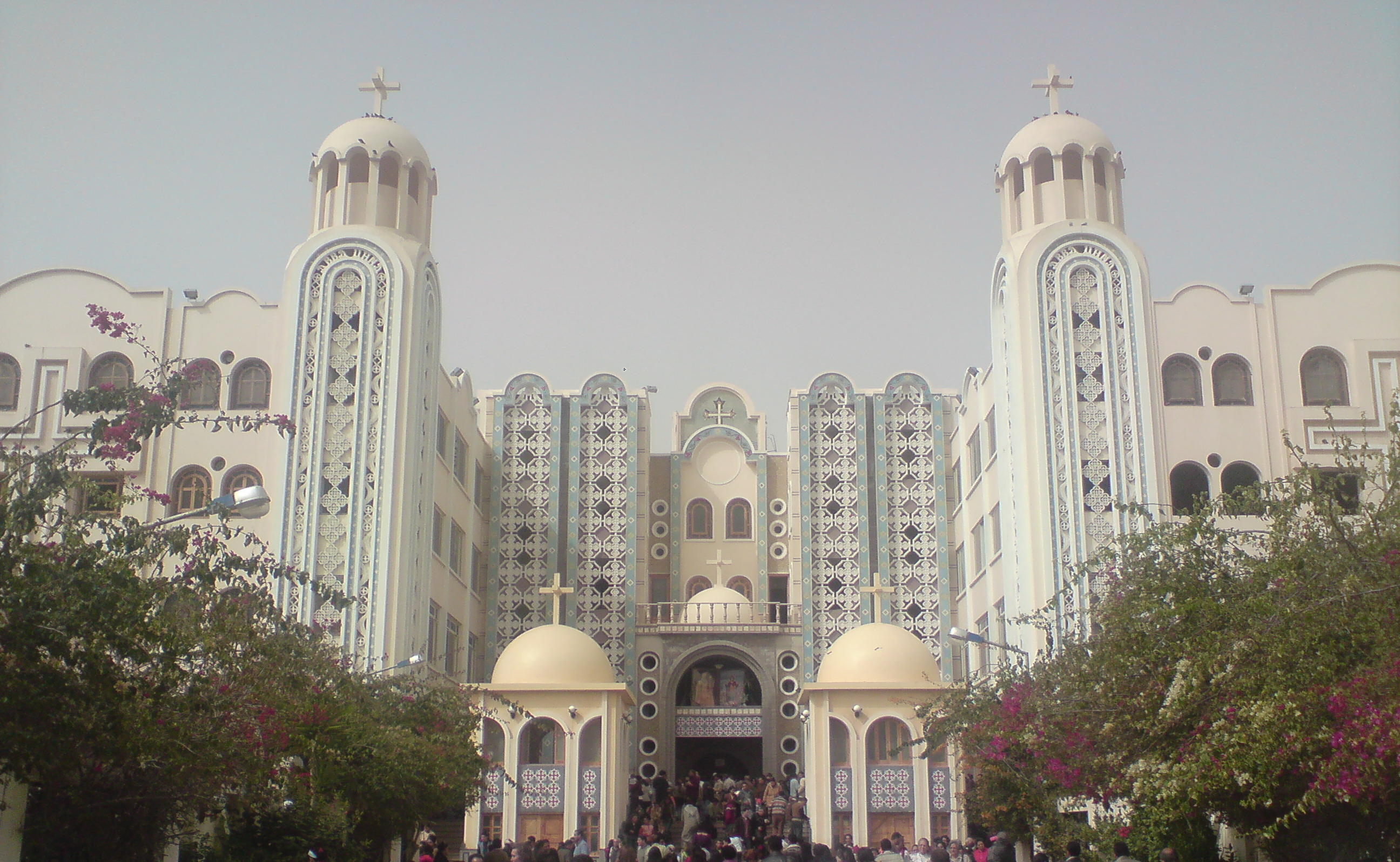
Monastery of Saint Mina, Western Desert, Egypt

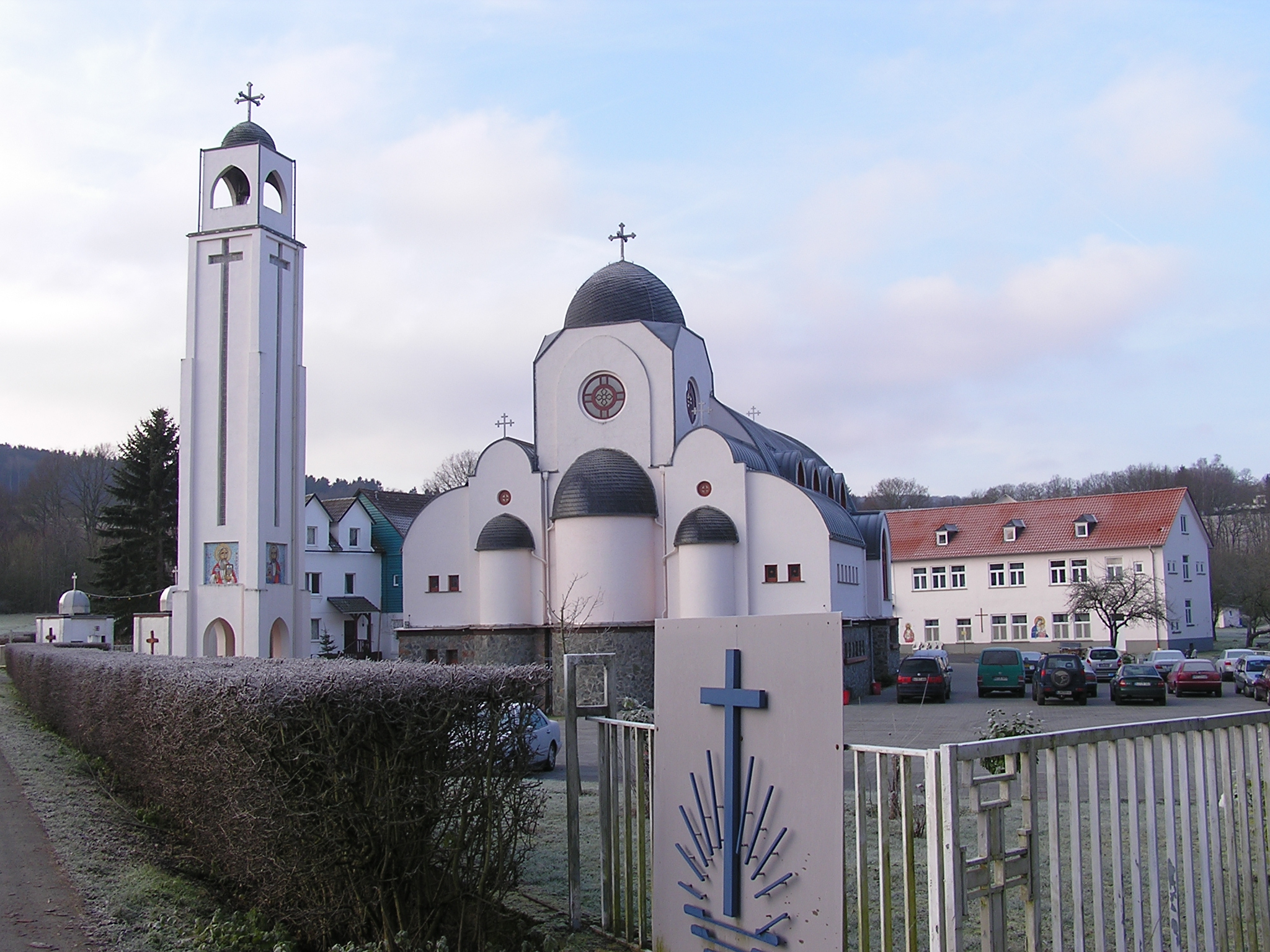
Monastery of Saint Anthony, Kröffelbach, Germany

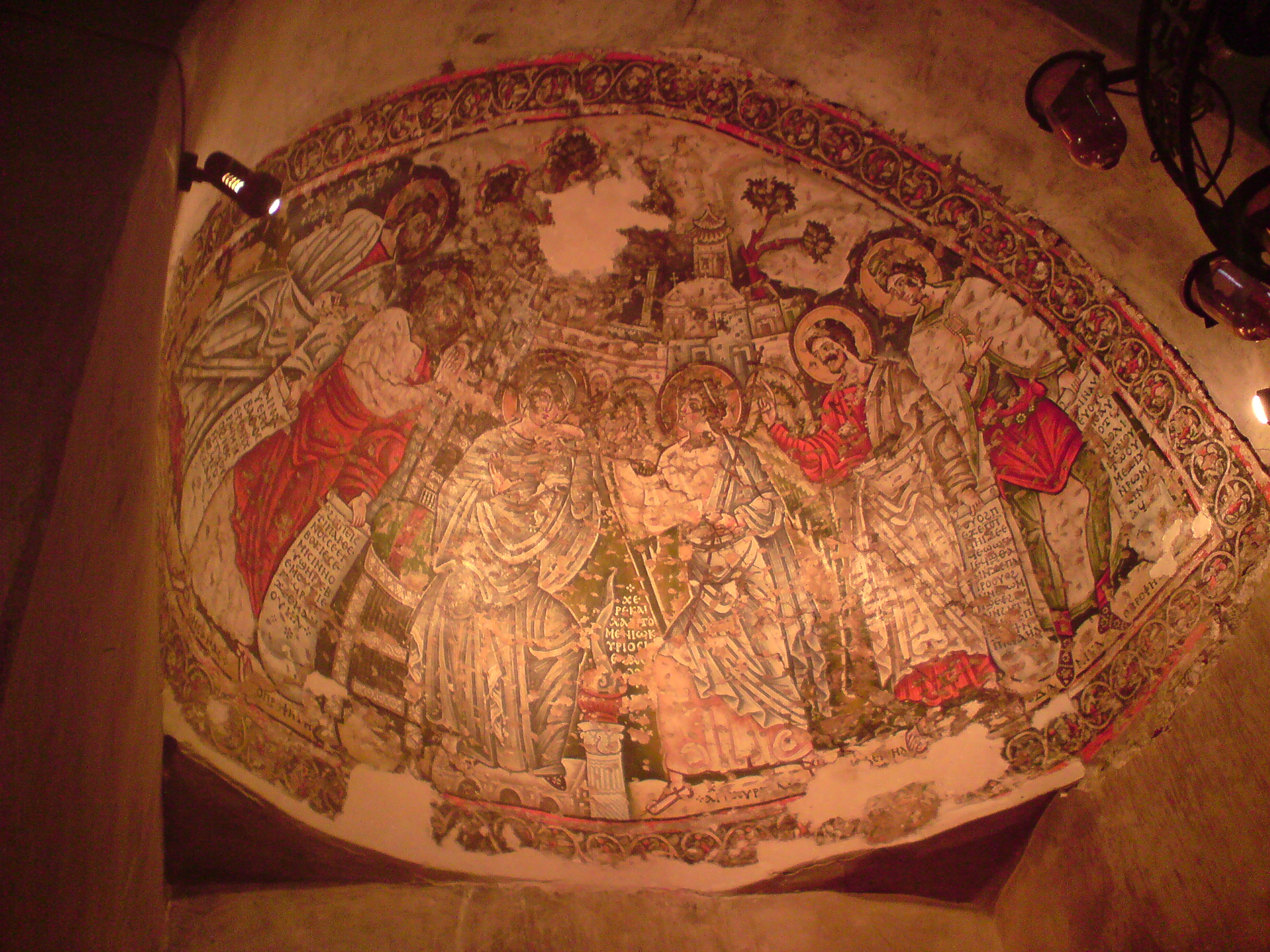
Frescos at the Syrian Monastery, Scetes, Egypt

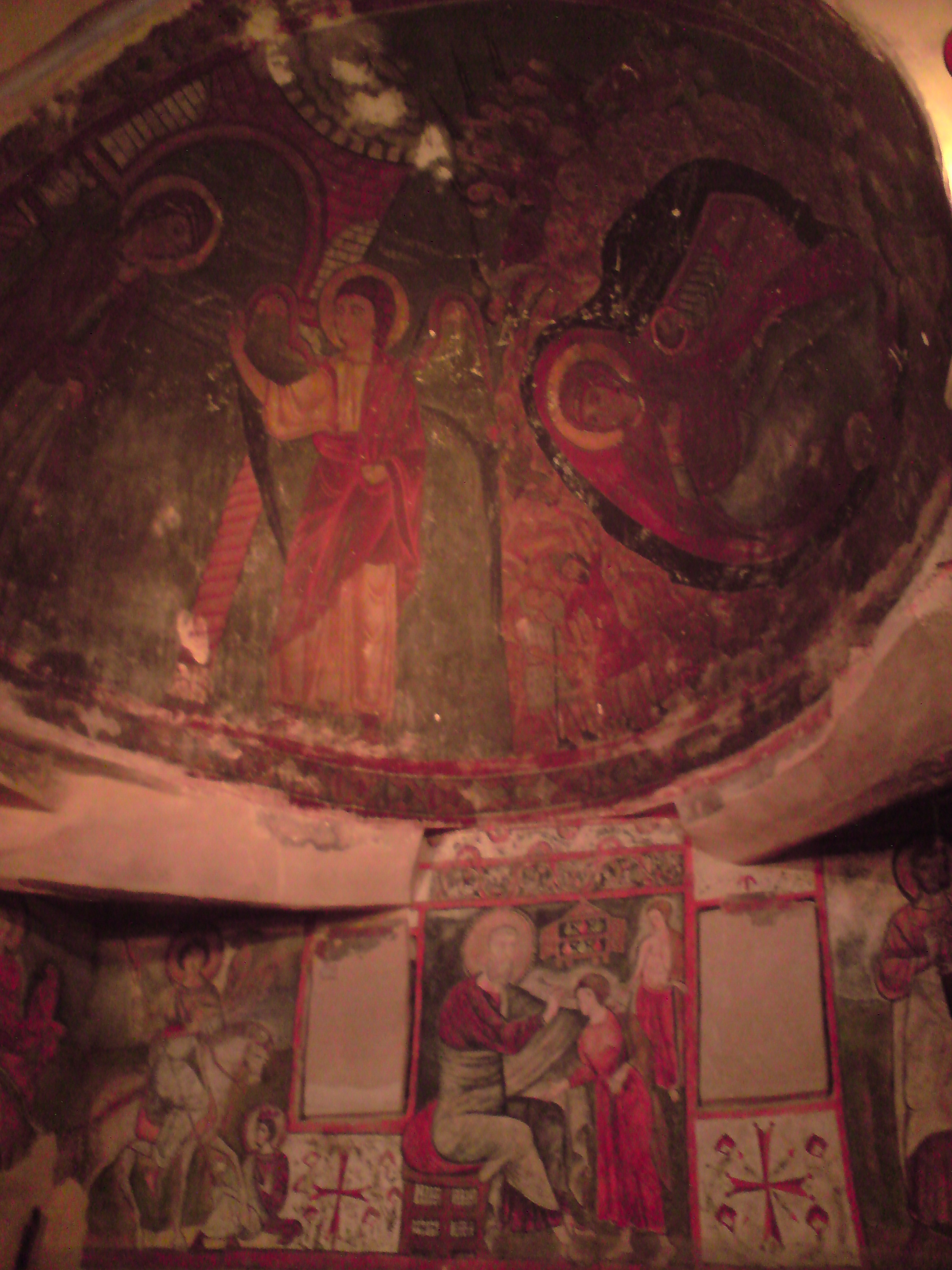
Frescos at the Syrian Monastery, Scetes, Egypt

== See also ==
- Christian monasticism before 451
- The Daughters of St. Mary
- Desert Fathers
- Eastern Christian monasticism
- List of Coptic monasteries
- Members of the Covenant
- Monophysitism
- Parabalani
- Tall Brothers
- Matta El Meskeen
- Chronology of early Christian monasticism
