= Noret-Khent =

Nome of Ancient Egypt

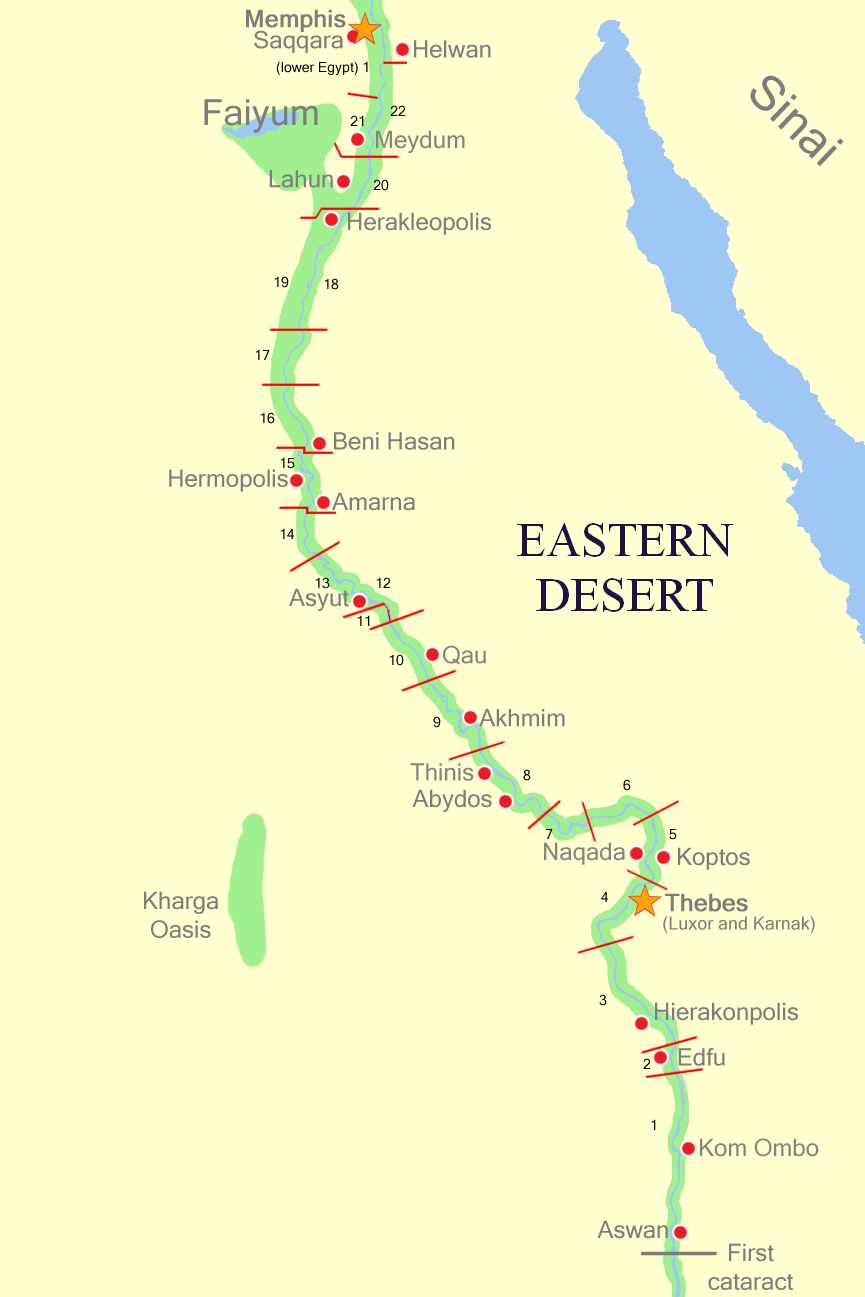
Map of nomes of Upper Egypt

Noret-Khent (Southern Sycamore land) or the Herakleopolite nome was a nome of Ancient Egypt, the 20th nome in Upper Egypt. Its capital was Heracleopolis Magna. The nome lies entirely within the modern Beni Suef Governorate.

The first mention of the region as a nome appears in the Old Kingdom, within the "Room of the Seasons" at the sun temple of Nyuserre.

The main deity worshipped in this nome was Heryshaf.

M1 W17 R12 N24
Noret-Khent
in hieroglyphs

== Geography ==
The Herakleopolite nome was one of the 22 nomes in Upper Egypt. It was located in the northern part of Upper Egypt.
