= Athanasius, Metropolitan of Beni Suef =

Egyptian bishop

Metropolitan Athanasius Metropolitan of Beni Suef and El-Bahnasa
- Late Metropolitan of the Holy Metropolis of Beni Suef
- Coptic cross
- Installed: 7 September 1958
- Other post: Was a member of The Holy Synod of the Coptic Orthodox Church.

Orders
- Ordination: 9 September 1962
- Consecration: 1978

Personal details
- Born: Abdel-Masih Bishara; 2 May 1923 El-Mahalla El-Kubra Egypt
- Died: 16 November 2000 (aged 77) Beni Suef
- Buried: Beni Suef
- Denomination: Oriental Orthodoxy

Metropolitan Athanasius (1923–2000) was the Coptic Orthodox bishop of Beni Suef and El-Bahnasa in Egypt from 1962 until his death in 2000. Like Pope Shenouda III, Bishop Athanasius had his roots in the Sunday School movement, a reform movement in the Coptic Orthodox Church of Egypt.

== Life ==
=== Early life ===
He was born in El-Mahalla al-Kubra on May 2, 1923, with the name Abdelmasih Bishara. His family was known by the name qassis (meaning "priest") because of the large number of Coptic clergy it had produced over at least six generations. Most famously, Bishara's uncle was Pope Macarius III who had served as the 114th Patriarch of the Coptic Church from 1944 to 1945.

After completing high school, he studied at the American University in Cairo, earning a Licenciate in English Literature (1944) and a Bachelor of Education and Psychology (1952), while also working as an English teacher in Aswan and lecturing on the New Testament in the Coptic Theological Seminary in Cairo.

=== Monastic life ===
On September 7, 1958, he joined the Syrian Monastery, taking the monastic name of Macarius al-Suryani.

=== Bishop of Beni Suef and El-Bahnasa ===
On July 22, 1962, the previous Metropolitan of Beni Suef (also named Athanasius) died. On September 9 of the same year, Pope Kyrillos VI ordained Macarius al-Suryani as the new bishop of Beni Suef and added El-Bahnasa to this bishopric, giving him the name of his predecessor. Thus, he is sometimes referred to as Athanasius II of Beni Suef.

The bishop started his own Sunday School branch in Faggala, Cairo, then became a monk and became the first reform monk to be consecrated as a diocesan bishop (Beni Suef) in 1962.

In the 1960s, Bishop Athanasius founded The Daughters of Saint Mary in Beni Suef, an order of serving nuns who played a role in various social projects in the community. Bishop Athanasius actively sought dialogue with Muslims in the 1970s and 80s and alongside Bishop Samuel, represented the Coptic Orthodox Church outside of Egypt.

Dr. Maurice Assad, former Secretary-General of the Middle-East Council of Churches, wrote "Bishop Athanasius was known for his weekly Bible study meetings in Beni Suef which were always attended by hundreds of people. Whenever he went on a pastoral visit in his diocese, he did not confine himself to the rich but also visited the poorest of the poor. In fact he made it a point to visit every family at least once a year in his diocese, the poor before the rich. Only in the last few years could he no longer do this because of health reasons, and he had to limit himself to visits of each church in the towns and villages of his diocese."

=== Relations with Pope Shenouda ===
When President Sadat placed Coptic leader Pope Shenouda under house arrest in 1981, confining him to the Monastery of St Bishoy, a papal committee of five bishops was formed to take over the duties of the pope, and one of the appointed bishops was Bishop Athanasius. The papal committee left only the spiritual authority to Pope Shenouda III, but not the rule of the church.

Pope Shenouda's rule of the church was restored with his return to Cairo with Coptic Christmas, January 1985. Pope Shenouda had difficulties in reconciling with former members of the papal committee. The decisions that they had taken in this interim period (1981–1985) were annulled. From this moment on Pope Shenouda made sure he was representing the church on an international level. In 1994 Pope Shenouda III became one of the presidents of the World Council of Churches (WCC).

It took years for Pope Shenouda to reconcile with Bishop Athanasius. In 1992 and 1994 the bishop was absent from patriarchal anniversaries, but during the Christmas celebration in January 1999 he was welcomed by Pope Shenouda in the Coptic Orthodox Cathedral in Cairo and received from the church goers a standing ovation.

== Man of dialogue ==
Bishop Athanasius advocated Christian unity, ecumenical relations and active dialogue between churches. Bishop Athanasius did not agree with Pope Shenouda's policy of asking Christians from other churches who want to join the Coptic Orthodox Church to be re-baptized. The bishop however, also stated he would abide by the rulings of his church.

Bishop Athanasius was also a man of Muslim-Christian dialogue. He made it explicitly clear he didn't believe in a theological dialogue with Islam, but that for him dialogue meant finding ways of living together in peace. He argued that having a Christian house of worship is more important than a church tower which at times was more a symbol of pride than a symbol of Christian humility. He was willing to sacrifice the tower, or to shorten it, if this would help him to obtain a permit for the building. His attitude may have been an important factor in the tremendous increase in number of churches in his diocese: from about 60 in 1962 to about 130 in the year 2000.

Bishop Athanasius was able to handle difficult cases of conversions of Christians to Islam, seeking to protect his Christian community while at the same time making great efforts to avoid relations with Muslims turning sour. One way of doing so was to avoid foreign publicity in order to expose problems. He would ask Muslims seeking the conversion of Christian minors to abide by the law that prohibits conversions of minors and would seek the support of higher authorities if lower government authorities were not implementing the law.

== See also ==
- The Holy Synod of the Coptic Orthodox Church
- Coptic Orthodox Church
- The Daughters of St. Mary
- List of Copts
