= Beni Suef University =

University in Egypt

- Former names: Cairo University, Beni-Suef branch
- Type: Public
- Established: 1976 as a branch of Cairo University then as an independent University on 2005
- President: Mansor Hassan
- Dean: 32
- Academic staff: 2760
- Administrative staff: 3270
- Students: 63456 students
- Location: Beni Suef, Egypt; 29°04′53″N 31°06′02″E
- Campus: Urban
- Website: www.bsu.edu.eg/

Beni Suef University is an institution of higher education located in Beni Suef, Egypt.

== History ==
Although established as an independent university in 2005, it began on 1976 as a branch of Cairo University. Finally, the presidential decree N.184 dated 2005 was issued to establish Beni-Suef University.

== Organization ==
=== Faculties and institutes ===
There are 32 faculties as well as one institute of the Beni Suef University, each with its own internal structure and activities. The heads of Beni Suef faculties are known as dean. The faculties and institutes join as the committee of to discuss policy and to deal with the central administration. The university and its faculties provide social, cultural, and recreational activities for their members and students. Faculties fellow the rules of ministry of higher education for admitting undergraduate.

==== Humanities and Social Sciences ====
Faculties of Commerce, Law, Education and Arts.

==== Medical and Life Sciences ====
Faculties of Veterinary Medicine, Science, Medicine, Pharmacy, Nursing, Physical Education as well as Institute of Nursing.

==== Engineering ====
Faculty of Computers and Artificial Intelligence beside Faculties of Industrial Education and Engineering.

=== Teaching and degrees ===
Bachelor and licence degrees are provided depending on the faculties. Research degrees at the Master's and Ph.D. levels are conferred in all subjects studied at graduate level at the university.

== See also ==
- Education in Egypt
- List of universities in Egypt
