= Sumusta =

City in Egypt

Sumusta سمسطا
- City
- Location in Egypt
- Coordinates: 28.920814°N 30.853626°E
- Country: Egypt
- Governorate: Beni Suef

Population (2020)
  - Total: 63,331
- Time zone: UTC+2 (EET)
  - Summer (DST): UTC+3 (EEST)

Sumusta (Arabic: سمسطا) is a city in the Beni Suef Governorate, Egypt. Its population was estimated at 63,000 people in 2020.

The name of the city comes from Ancient Greek: Σεσφθα, romanized: Sesphtha, where -σφθ- comes from Ancient Egyptian: sbtj, lit. 'wall'.
