= Beni Suef =

Beni Suef بنى سويف
- City
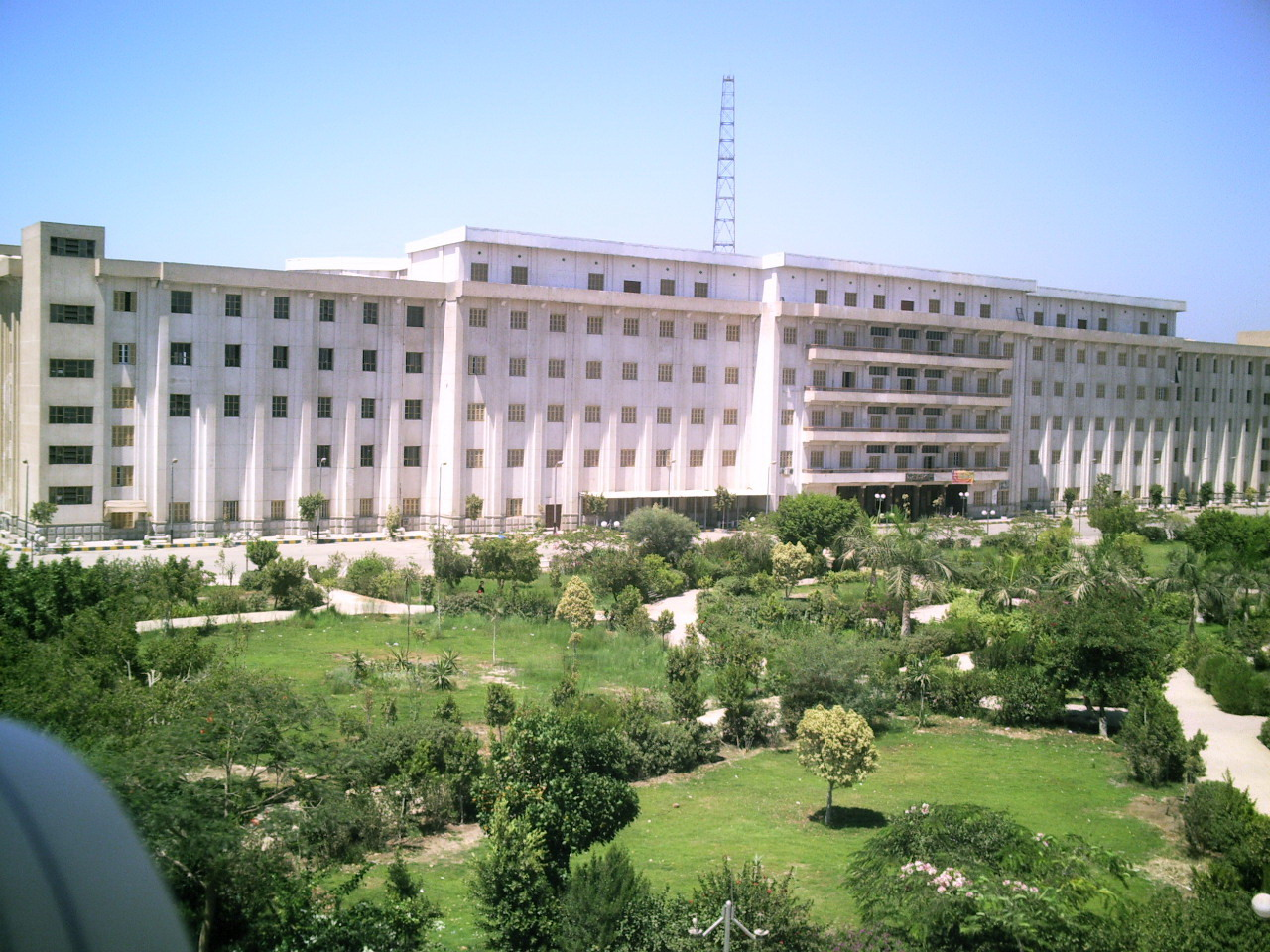
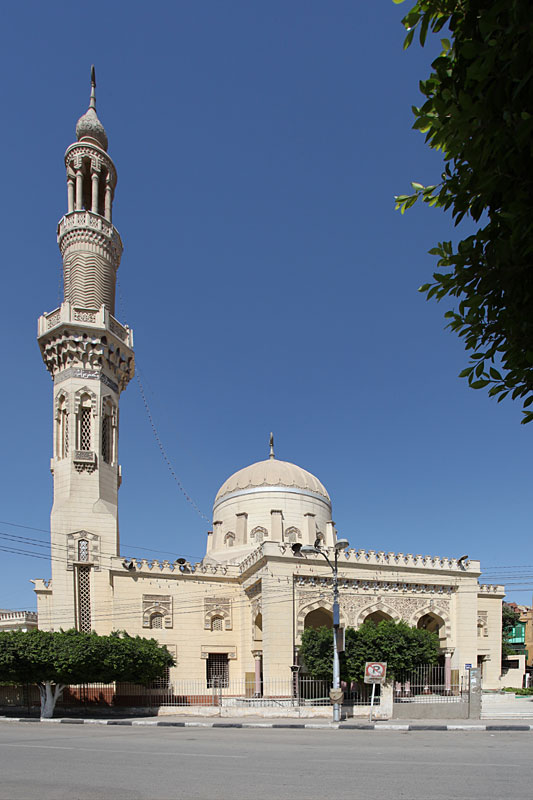
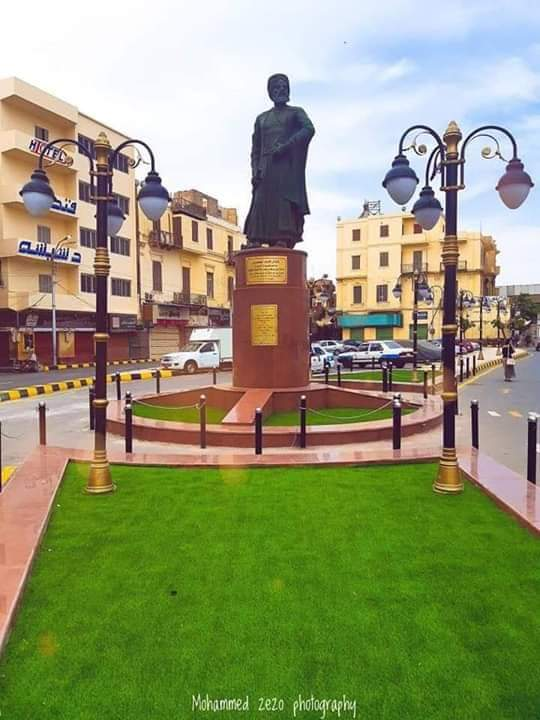
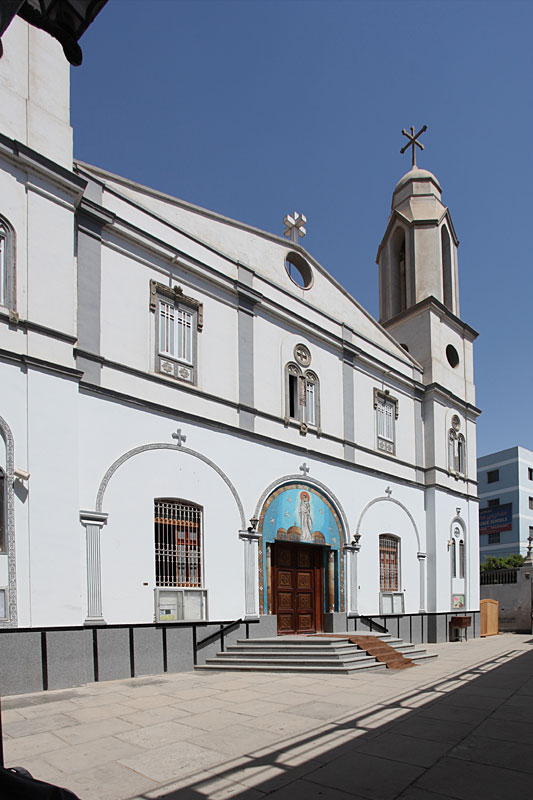
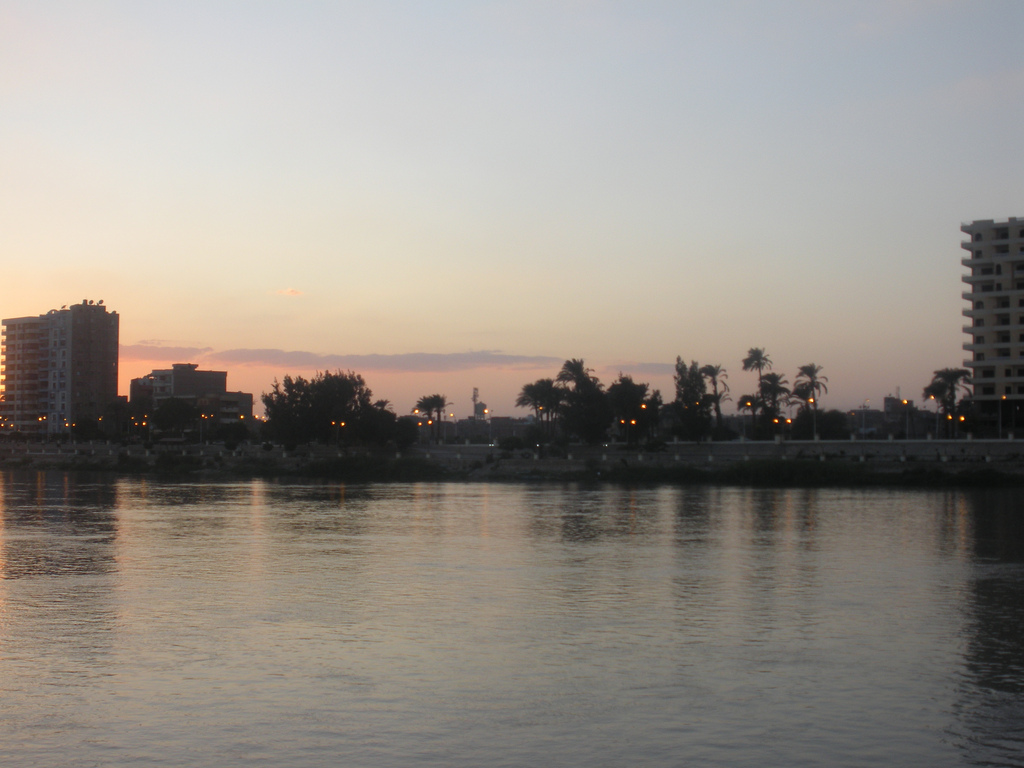
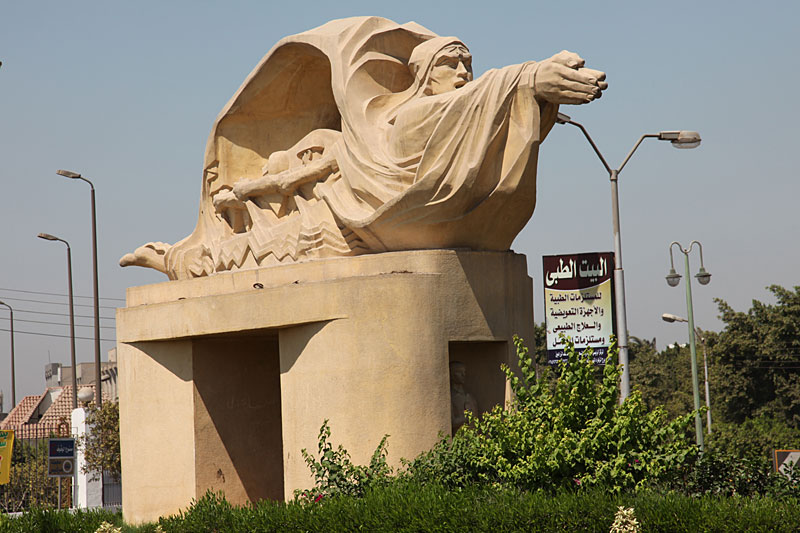
- University of Beni Suef Omar Ibn Abdel Aziz Mosque Mahatta Square Holy Virgin Church The Nile October War Memorial

- Location within Egypt
- Coordinates: 29°04′N 31°05′E
- Country: Egypt
- Governorate: Beni Suef

Area
  - Total: 14.00 km^{2} (5.41 sq mi)
- Elevation: 33 m (108 ft)

Population (2023)
  - Total: 294,125
  - Density: 21,010/km^{2} (54,410/sq mi)
- Time zone: UTC+2 (EET)
  - Summer (DST): UTC+3 (EEST)
- Area code: (+20) 82

Beni Suef (Egyptian Arabic: بنى سويف, romanized: Baniswēf) is the capital city of the Beni Suef Governorate in Egypt. The city is the location of Beni Suef University. An important agricultural trade centre on the west bank of the Nile River, the city is located 110 km (70 miles) south of Cairo.

== Etymology ==
The modern name of the town is a corruption of its original name Manfiswayh (Arabic: منفسويه), which itself comes from a Coptic toponymic construction ⲡ-ⲙⲁ-ⲛ-... ("the place of..."); however, its exact etymology is unknown.

== History ==
From the early Pharaonic era to the Roman period, the area was home to the city of Heracleopolis, 10 miles west of the modern city. which also served as the capital of Lower and Middle Egypt during the 9th and 10th dynasties. The modern city rose to prominence during the Middle Ages, when it was renowned for its linen manufacturing, which continues to the present day through the city's carpet making and cotton spinning industries. Beni Suef became the chief town of the second province of Upper Egypt during the reign of Muhammad Ali in the 19th century.

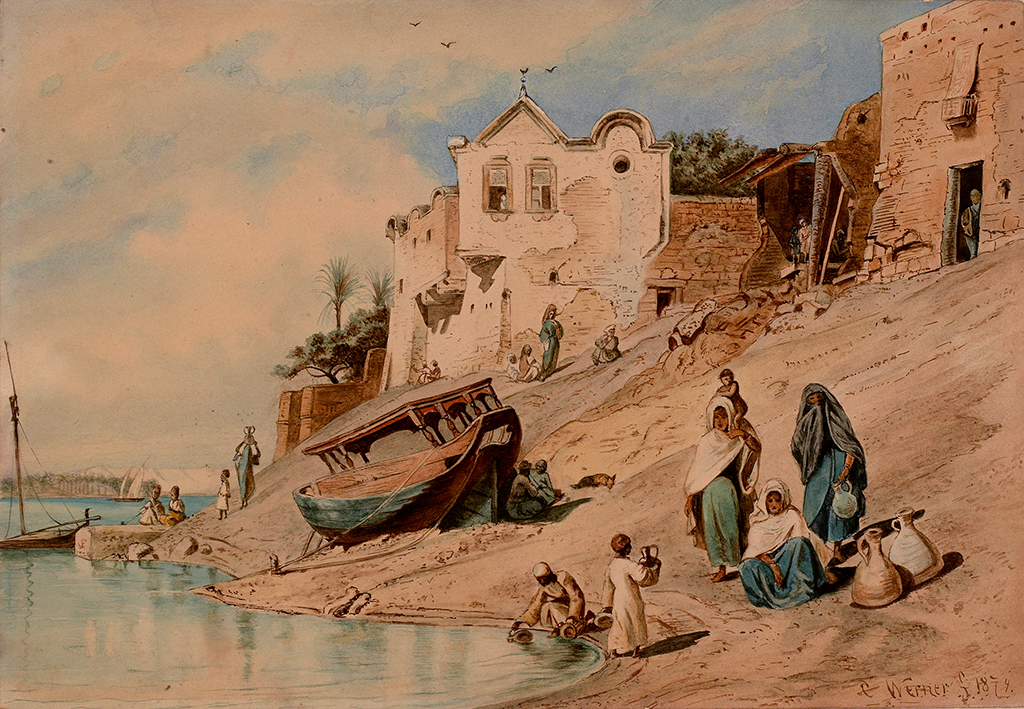
Beni Suef at 1874 by Carl Friedrich Heinrich Werner

== Geography ==
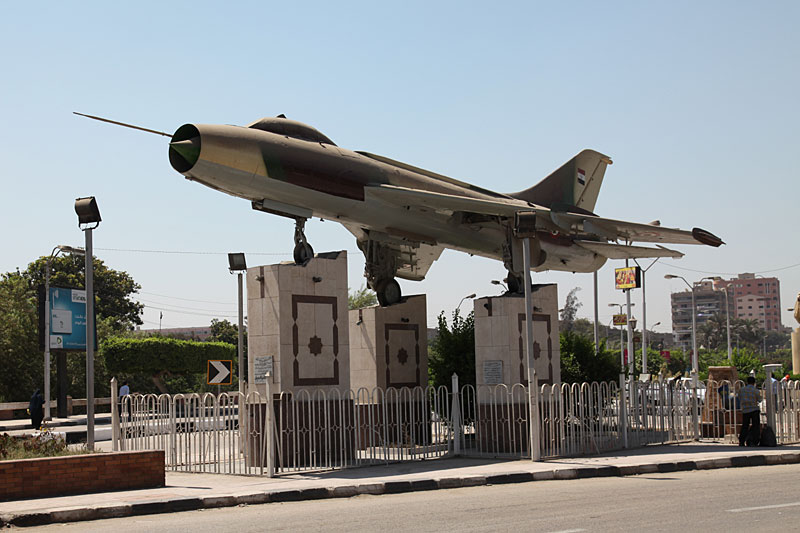
Fighter memorial with Sukhoi Su-7

The total area of the governorate is 1,954 square kilometers, and it is divided into six governorates. It is bordered to the north by Giza governorate and Helwan, to the northeast by Suez, to the east by the Red Sea governorate, to the west by Fayoum governorate, and to the south by Minya governorate. This region connects the north of Egypt to the south, and the east to the west, and this identity of centrality has formed the population, civilization, and economic characters of the region. The geographical proximity to vital governorates such as Cairo and Giza is significant, and the governorates of the Red Sea, Suez, Fayoum and Ismailia tourist areas all act as markets for the industrial products made in Beni Suef.

=== Climate ===
Beni Suef has a hot desert climate (BWh) in Köppen-Geiger classification, as does all of Egypt. It has very hot summers and warm winters with cool nights.

Climate data for Beni Suef
Month	Jan	Feb	Mar	Apr	May	Jun	Jul	Aug	Sep	Oct	Nov	Dec	Year
Record high °C (°F)	30.4 (86.7)	34.4 (93.9)	39.0 (102.2)	43.3 (109.9)	47.7 (117.9)	46.8 (116.2)	44.9 (112.8)	44.2 (111.6)	43.4 (110.1)	39.9 (103.8)	36.2 (97.2)	29.9 (85.8)	47.7 (117.9)
Mean daily maximum °C (°F)	19.5 (67.1)	21.5 (70.7)	25.0 (77.0)	30.3 (86.5)	34.2 (93.6)	36.9 (98.4)	37.1 (98.8)	36.6 (97.9)	34.7 (94.5)	31.0 (87.8)	25.3 (77.5)	20.9 (69.6)	29.4 (84.9)
Daily mean °C (°F)	12.3 (54.1)	14.2 (57.6)	17.2 (63.0)	22.0 (71.6)	26.0 (78.8)	28.7 (83.7)	29.3 (84.7)	28.9 (84.0)	27.1 (80.8)	23.5 (74.3)	18.2 (64.8)	13.7 (56.7)	21.8 (71.2)
Mean daily minimum °C (°F)	5.6 (42.1)	6.9 (44.4)	9.6 (49.3)	13.8 (56.8)	17.4 (63.3)	20.2 (68.4)	21.6 (70.9)	21.4 (70.5)	19.5 (67.1)	16.7 (62.1)	11.7 (53.1)	7.4 (45.3)	14.3 (57.7)
Record low °C (°F)	−0.2 (31.6)	0.8 (33.4)	2.5 (36.5)	2.0 (35.6)	9.5 (49.1)	15.3 (59.5)	18.0 (64.4)	18.6 (65.5)	9.0 (48.2)	10.7 (51.3)	1.8 (35.2)	0.8 (33.4)	−0.2 (31.6)
Average precipitation mm (inches)	1 (0.0)	1 (0.0)	2 (0.1)	0 (0)	0 (0)	0 (0)	0 (0)	0 (0)	0 (0)	0 (0)	1 (0.0)	0 (0)	6 (0.2)
Average precipitation days (≥ 1.0 mm)	0.3	0.1	0.2	0.0	0.1	0.0	0.0	0.0	0.1	0.0	0.0	0.2	0.9
Average relative humidity (%)	61	54	49	40	37	39	45	50	51	54	58	63	50.1
Source 1: NOAA
Source 2: Climate Charts

== Accidents ==
- A train accident in 1995 near Beni Suef left 75 people dead.
- The Beni Suef Cultural Palace Fire, on September 5, 2005, killed 46 people.

== Sports ==
- Telephonat Beni Suef SC football team was promoted for the first time to the Egyptian Premier League for the 2011/2012 season. Currently they play in the Egyptian Second Division B for the 2025/2026 season.
- Beni Suef SC football team play in the Egyptian Third Division Group 4 as of the 2025/2026 season.

== Notable people ==
- Berlenti Abdul Hamid, actress
- Ali Khalil, Egyptian footballer

== See also ==
- Sannur Cave national park
- Bishop Athanasius
- List of cities and towns in Egypt
