= Beni Suef Governorate =

Governorate of Egypt

Beni Suef Governorate محافظة بني سويف
- Governorate
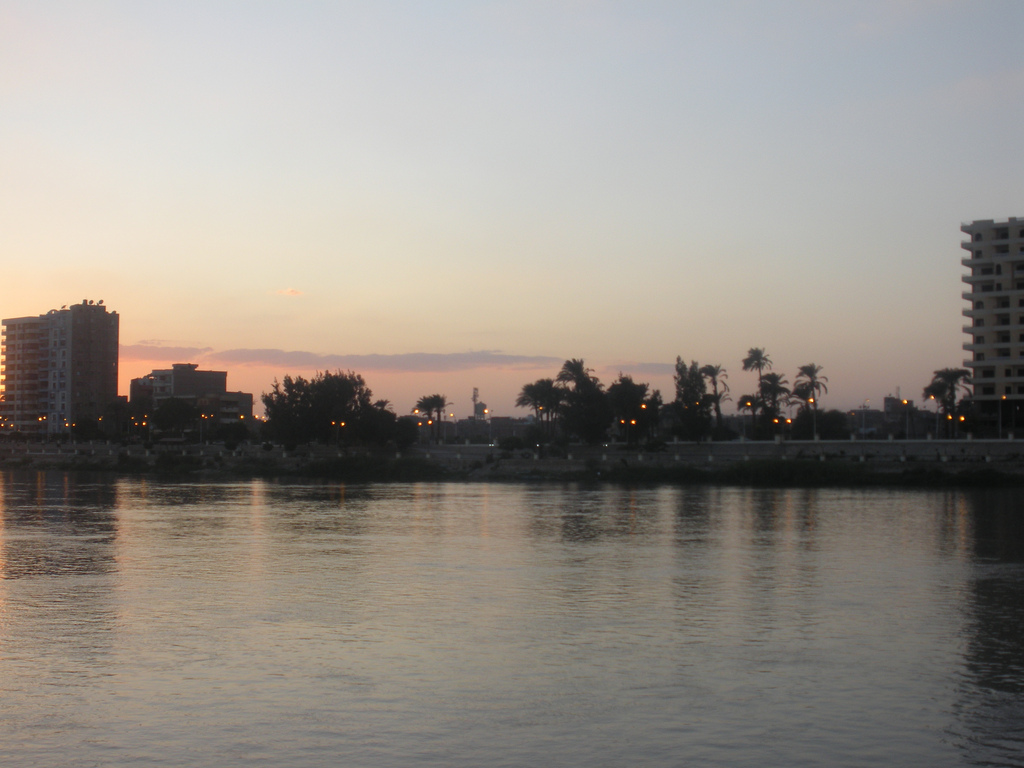
- The Nile in Beni Suef

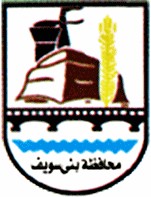
- Flag

- Beni Suef Governorate on the map of Egypt
- Coordinates: 29.076°N 31.097°E
- Country: Egypt
- Seat: Beni Suef (capital)

Government
  - Governor: Mohamed Hany Godeim

Area
  - Total: 1,322 km^{2} (510 sq mi)

Population (January 2023)
  - Total: 3,561,639
  - Density: 2,694/km^{2} (6,978/sq mi)

GDP
  - Total: EGP 87 billion (US$ 5.6 billion)
- Time zone: UTC+02:00 (EET)
  - Summer (DST): UTC+03:00
- HDI (2021): 0.697 medium 19th
- Website: www.benisuef.gov.eg

Beni Suef (Arabic: محافظة بني سويف Muḥāfāzah Banī Suwīf) is one of the governorates of Egypt. It is situated in the center of the country and is located in northern Upper Egypt.

== Overview ==
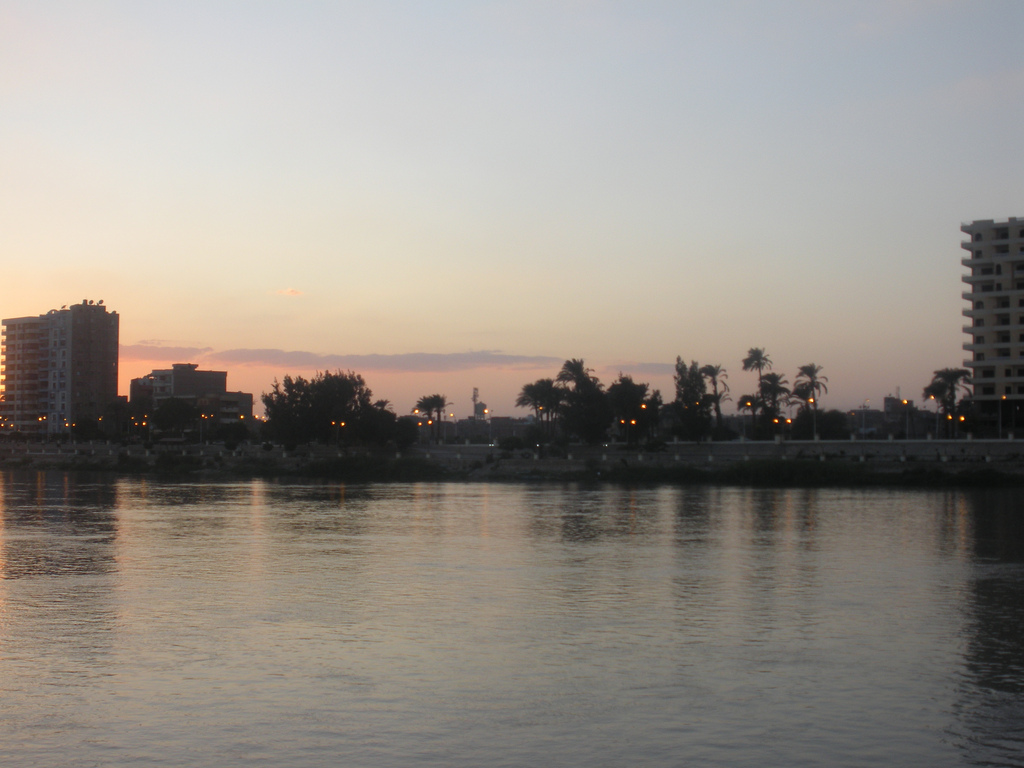
Nile River in Beni Suef

The governorate's capital is the city of Beni Suef, located about 120 km south of Cairo on the west bank of the Nile River. The area is well known in Egypt for its cement factories. The nearby Meidum pyramid is the only prominent tourist attraction in the area.

Due to different ways of transcribing the spelling it can also be known as Beni Suef, or Beni Swaif.

The rate of poverty is more than 60% in this governorate but recently some social safety networks have been provided in the form of financial assistance and job opportunities. The funding has been coordinated by the country's Ministry of Finance and with assistance from international organizations.

== Municipal divisions ==
The governorate is divided into the following municipal divisions for administrative purposes with a total estimated population as of January 2023 of 3,561,639. In some cases a markaz and a kism share a name.

Municipal Divisions
Anglicized name	Native name	Arabic transliteration	Population (January 2023 Est.)	Type
Beni Suef	قسم بنى سويف	Banī Suwayf	288,642	Kism (fully urban)
Beni Suef	مركز بنى سويف	Banī Suwayf	471,581	Markaz
Biba	مركز ببا	Bibā	524,012	Markaz
El Fashn	مركز الفشن	Al-Fashn	527,561	Markaz
El Wasta	مركز الواسطى	Al-Wāsṭā	545,989	Markaz
Ihnasiya	مركز إهناسيا	Ihnāsiyā	435,532	Markaz
Nasser	مركز ناصر	Nāṣir	373,510	Markaz
New Beni Suef	قسم مدينة بنى سويف الجديدة	Madīnat Banī Suwayf al-Jadīdah	34,108	Kism (fully urban)
Sumusta El Waqf	مركز سمسطا	Sumusṭā al-Waqf	310,449	Markaz

== Population ==
According to population estimates from 2015 the majority of residents in the governorate live in rural areas, with an urbanization rate of only 23.2%. Out of an estimated 2,856,812 people residing in the governorate, 2,193,871 people live in rural areas as opposed to only 662,941 in urban areas.

== Industrial zones ==
According to the Governing Authority for Investment and Free Zones (GAFI), the following industrial zones are located in Beni Suef:

Zone name
Gabal Ghareb Industrial Zone
New Beni Suef Industrial Zone
