= God, Syria, and Bashar! =

Syrian pro-Assad song by Rami Kazour

- Flag of Ba'athist Syria

Song by Rami Kazour
- Language: Syrian Arabic
- Released: 2012
- Genre: Political music

"God, Syria, and Bashar!" (Arabic: الله، سوريا، وبشار, romanized: Allah, Souriya, w Bashar) is a song composed by Rami Kazour praising then Syrian President—Bashar al-Assad—created after the killing of Ibrahim Qashoush, who was at the time alleged to have written the anti‑Assad song "Yalla Erhal Ya Bashar" during the early Syrian revolution. The song was likely released as to mock Qashoush's death.

The song has become an internet meme in the years since, experiencing a small resurgence in the aftermath of the fall of the Ba'athist regime in December 2024.

== Background ==
Ibrahim Qashoush (إبراهيم قاشوش) was a Syrian from Hama, and worked as a security guard at the local fire station. He became known for allegedly leading demonstrations calling for the overthrow of the regime and was incorrectly credited as the creator of "Yalla Erhal Ya Bashar".

On 3 July 2011, Qashoush was abducted by pro-Assad forces. His body was later found in the Orontes River in Hama, with his vocal cords having been removed. It was discovered in a British interview in 2016 that the true composer of Yalla Erhal Ya Bashar was Abdul Rahman Farhood, who had fled Syria and had kept his identity as the true composer secret out of fear.

== Composition ==
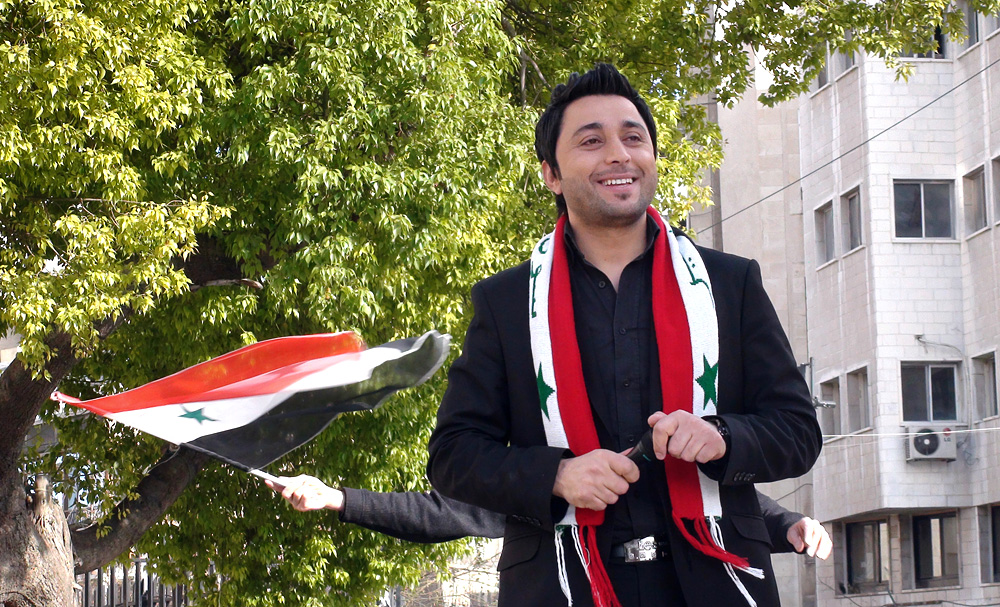
Rami Kazour preparing for a pro-Assad rally in Damascus, 14 January 2012

The song has a tempo of 122 beats per minute (BPM). It is in the key of C major and features Arabic pop elements. The song shares much of the same melody as Yalla Erhal Ya Bashar.

The lyrics of the song praise Bashar al-Assad and his father Hafez al-Assad, as well as making reference to important figures and events in Syrian history such as Yusuf al-Azma, Ibrahim Hananu, the Franco-Syrian War, and the Israeli-occupied Golan Heights.

== Release ==
The release of the song mainly occurred digitally. Kazour's song was released as a counter‑message and has been interpreted by observers as an attempt to mock Yalla Erhal Ya Bashar.

After the fall of the Assad regime in the winter of 2024 the song has had a small resurgence in popularity, mainly as an internet meme. Around this time Kazour allegedly changed his Instagram profile picture (PFP) to the Syrian opposition flag.

=== Message ===
In an interview, Kazour defended the song's phrasing and said it was meant to provoke protesters, whom he referred to as "trash". He described Assad as the "last honorable Arab leader" and argued that Syria was unlike other Arab countries that had seen unrest, referring to Syria as "a nation of lions, exceptional in everything".

== See also ==
- Music of Syria
  - Arabic music
  - Music and politics
    - Music and political warfare
- Arab Spring
  - Timeline of the Arab Spring
  - Arts of the Arab Spring
  - Arab Winter
    - Syrian civil war
    - Syrian revolution
- Timeline of the Syrian civil war
- 2010s in Syrian history
- Syrian civil war in popular culture
