= Yalla Erhal Ya Bashar (song) =

Syrian anti-Assad song

- Syrian opposition revolution flag

Song by Abdel Rahman Farhood
- Language: Syrian Arabic
- Released: 2011
- Genre: Political music

"Yalla Erhal Ya Bashar" (Arabic: يلا إرحال يا بشار, lit. 'Leave, O Bashar') was a protest song and chant sung by protesters and demonstrators during the early phases of the Syrian revolution. The chant was directed against the regime of former President Bashar al-Assad. The song was composed by Syrian opposition activist Abdel Rahman Farhood (عبد الرحمن فرهود). However, the writing credit of the song was frequently misattributed to Ibrahim Qashoush (إبراهيم قاشوش).

Consequently, the song left a meaningful impact on Syrian society and the world's perception of the conflict. The protesters demanded, through this phrase and other similar ones, that Syrian President Bashar al-Assad—who had led the republic since the 2000 presidential referendum—step down. The song has had a small resurgence in popularity since the fall of the Assad regime.

== Origins ==
Protesters chant "Yalla Erhal Ya Bashar" during an evening demonstration in Hama's Assi Square.

The slogan Erhal ya Bashar originated during the beginning of the Syrian revolution in 2011. Demonstrators in cities such as Daraa, Homs, and Hama began chanting it to demand the resignation of President Bashar al-Assad, whose regime was widely accused of authoritarianism, corruption, and human rights abuses. The chant gained momentum as protests spread across the country, and it became a unifying call for Syrians from diverse backgrounds.

The chant's popularity was amplified by its simplicity and directness, which allowed it to resonate across Syria's linguistic and cultural divides. It was often accompanied by other slogans calling for freedom (الحُرّيّة), dignity (الكرامة), and the downfall of the regime (الشعب يريد إسقاط النظام).

=== Composition ===
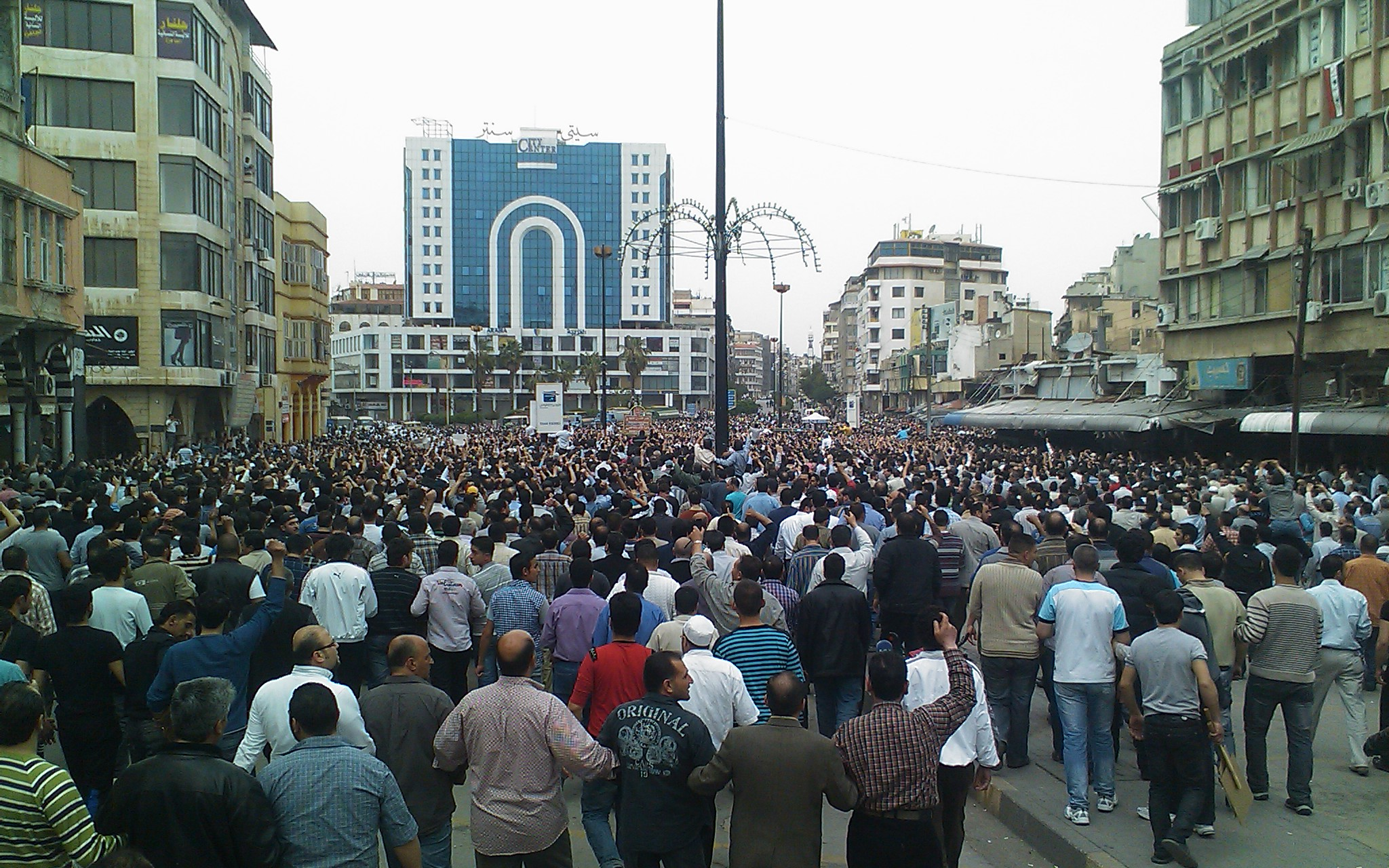
Demonstration in Homs, Syria, against the Assad regime.

In a magazine article released in the United Kingdom in 2016, exiled Syrian opposition activist Abdel Rahman Farhood confessed his identity as the real author and singer of the protest song attributed to Qashoush. According to him—in July 2011—he himself learned from the media that the singer of Yalla Erhal Ya Bashar was found murdered. As a result, it was inadvisable for him to contradict this account, which had apparently been accepted by the majority of revolutionaries and government loyalists alike. He never knew Qashoush or who killed him.

As early as July 2011, The New York Times portrayed Farhood as the song's writer and at least occasional singer. In 2012, the blog The Truth About Syria also identified Farhood as the author and singer of Yalla Erhal Ya Bashar—the blog also claimed that Farhood had been among those who: "photographed Qashoush's corpse". After the fall of Assad regime in late 2024, it was officially confirmed—in Arabic media—that the singer of Yalla Erhal Ya Bashar was Abdel Rahman Farhood.

=== Ibrahim Qashoush ===
There are hardly any confirmed facts about Qashoush's life. American journalist Anthony Shadid, who interviewed Hama residents about Qashoush in July 2011, reported the existence of numerous rumors in The New York Times (NYT).

In various—contradictory—media reports Qashoush was described as a firefighter, a security guard, a construction worker, and a popular singer. However it is considered that Qashoush was likely a security guard at a firestation.

Qashoush was from the city of Hama, and worked as a security guard at the local fire station. He became known for allegedly leading demonstrations calling for the overthrow of the regime and was often incorrectly credited as the writer of the song. On Friday, July 1, 2011, during what protesters called "Leave Friday" (جمعة ارحل) in Hama Governorate, The chant finally made its debut as approximately half a million demonstrators gathered in Assi Square, demanding the end of the regime.

== Lyrics ==
يا بشّار ويا مندسّ
وتضرب أنت وحزب البعث
وروح وصلّح حرف الـ"س"
ويلا إرحل يا بشّار
...
يا بشّار ويا جبان
ودّي جنودك عالجولان
الشّعب السّوري مَبينهان
ويلا إرحل يا بشّار
...
يا ماهر ويا جبان
ويا عميل الأمريكان
الشّعب السّوري مبينهان
ويلا إرحل يا بشّار
...
يا بشّار ويا كذّاب
وتضرب أنت وهالخطاب
الحرّية صارت على الباب
ويلا إرحل يا بشّار
...
يا بشّار ومالك منّا
خود ماهر وإرحل عنّا
وهاي شرعيّتك سقطت عنّا
ويلا إرحل يا بشّار
...
ويا بشّار وكفّي تدور
ودمّك بحماة مهدور
وخطأك مالو مغفور
ويلا إرحل يا بشّار
...
ويا بشّار وطز فيك
وطز باللي بيحيّيك
ومالي قادر طلّع فيك
ويلا إرحل يا بشّار

Translation:

Oh Bashar, you’re just a spy,
You and Ba'ath can’t pacify.
Go fix your "S" before you lie,
It’s time to leave now, Bashar, bye!
...
Oh Bashar, you’re such a coward,
Send your troops where they're empowered—
To Golan Heights, not on us showered!
It’s time to leave now, Bashar, bye!
...
Oh Maher, you’re just as weak,
An agent for the U.S. clique.
Our Syrian pride, you cannot tweak,
It’s time to leave now, Bashar, bye!
...
Oh Bashar, deceit’s your art,
Your speeches rot, they lack a heart.
But freedom's here, so now depart—
It’s time to leave now, Bashar, bye!
...
Oh Bashar, you’re not our kin,
Take Maher too, and pack him in.
Your false rule’s done; it’s all chagrin,
It’s time to leave now, Bashar, bye!
...
Oh Bashar, your crimes still roar,
Your hands are stained with Hama’s gore.
Forgiveness? None—it’s war no more.
It’s time to leave now, Bashar, bye!
...
Oh Bashar, we’ve had enough,
Your praise is hollow, fake, and bluff.
We can’t stand you; your time is up—
It’s time to leave now, Bashar, bye!

== Reactions ==
Protesters parade the flag of Syria and shout ash-shab yurid isqat an-nizam in the Assi Square of Hama during the siege in July 2011.

=== Killing of Ibrahim Qashoush ===
Security forces cracked down on demonstrators with live ammunition, arrests, and torture. Ibrahim Qashoush became a target due to the popularity of the song and his alleged connection to it. On July 3, 2011, Qashoush was abducted by pro-regime forces. His mutilated body was later found in the Orontes River in Hama, with his vocal cords having been removed.

After news of his murder spread and due to reports from other demonstrators, Qashoush began to be celebrated as the "nightingale of the revolution", a martyr, and a symbolic figure of the revolution both within Syria and internationally. All over the world, writers guilds, among other organizations, demonstrated against the murder of the protest singer by making public statements.

The case became so prominent that, on a rare, exclusive interview—in December 2011—American television journalist Barbara Walters addressed Qashoush directly with President Assad. Assad responded that he had never heard of Qashoush. Even the annual report of the U.S. Department of State (DOS) on the state of human rights in Syria, published in the spring of 2012, mentioned Qashoush as a singer who was tortured and murdered by a police officer as revenge for his protest songs. As such, Qashoush also began to be discussed in academic literature.

Syrian authorities denied the account of Qashoush being murdered by members of an intelligence agency—which began to spread in activist circles—and stated that he had nothing to do with the song, but rather had been working as an informant for the Syrian opposition and that his murder by an unknown entity was being used to instigate further violence.

==== The Truth About Syria blog ====
In 2012, the pro-Assad blog The Truth About Syria referred to statements given by an oppositionist under the name "Fadi Zreik" from Hama, who had confessed in prison and spoke on camera about Qashoush. The Truth About Syria's statements have, however, largely been dismissed.

The blog claims:

"Ibraheem Kashoush [sic] has become known world wide as the composer and signer of the so-called "Syrian Revolution", but was he really what the Syrian opposition claimed? The Syrian security managed to arrest terrorist "Fadi Zreik", and what is actually may be surprising for many of you is what he said in his confessions. "Ibraheem Kashoush" [sic] was a normal person who was slaughtered by Syrian rebels, because they thought he was an informant who works for the government. The man who actually composes the songs for the protesters was among those who photographed Qashoush's dead body, so he found it as an opportunity to conceal his identity and claim that Qashoush is the real composer."

==== "Freedom (Qashoush Symphony)" ====
In February 2012—Malek Jandali—a pianist of Syrian origin, released a musical work based on the melody of Yalla Erhal Ya Bashar and named it "Freedom (Qashoush Symphony)".

==== "God, Syria, and Bashar!" ====
Sometime after Qashoush's death, Syrian pop artist Rami Kazour (رامي كازور) released a song titled "God, Syria, and Bashar!" that praised Bashar al-Assad's regime and used a nearly identical melody to Yalla Erhal Ya Bashar. It has become an internet meme in the years since, especially in the aftermath of the fall of the Ba'athist regime.

== See also ==
- God, Syria, and Bashar! (song)
- Music of Syria
  - Arabic music
  - Music and politics
    - Music and political warfare
- Arab Spring
  - Timeline of the Arab Spring
  - Arts of the Arab Spring
  - Arab Winter
    - Syrian civil war
    - Syrian revolution
- Timeline of the Syrian civil war
- 2010s in Syrian history
- Syrian civil war in popular culture
- List of political slogans
  - Ash-shab yurid isqat an-nizam
  - Your turn has come, O Doctor
  - Marg bar Amrika
  - Marg bar Israil
  - Marg bar Diktator
  - Am Yisrael Chai
  - From the river to the sea
