= Women on Walls =

Public art project in Egypt

Women on Walls ست الحيطة
- Nickname: WOW
- Status: Inactive
- Genre: Public art
- Locations: Alexandria; Cairo; Luxor; Mansoura
- Country: Egypt
- Inaugurated: Spring 2013
- Founders: Angie Balata; Mia Gröndahl
- Most recent: 15 February 2014
- Participants: Aya Tarek
- Major events: Street art project
- Sponsor: Danish Center for Culture and Development
- Website: WOW - Women On Walls on Facebook

Women on Walls (Arabic: ست الحيطة Sitt el-Heita) is a public art project in Egypt aimed at empowering women through the use of street art, by encouraging the portrayal of strong Egyptian female figures in street art and empowering female street artists themselves to participate in the political space of graffiti. Building on the popularity of street art as a form of political expression during the January 25 revolution, the aim of this project is to increase awareness of women's issues by introducing women into public space. This project was co-founded by Mia Gröndahl, a Swedish street art documentarian, and Angie Balata, an Egyptian artist, in December 2012 with funding from the Danish Center for Culture and Development, and was launched with a month-long event in the Spring of 2013 in Cairo, Luxor, Alexandria, and Mansoura that included painting sessions, workshops, and lectures on topics ranging from art to women's issues more generally. The project held its second campaign in February 2014.

== Historical background ==
=== Political graffiti and the Arab Spring ===
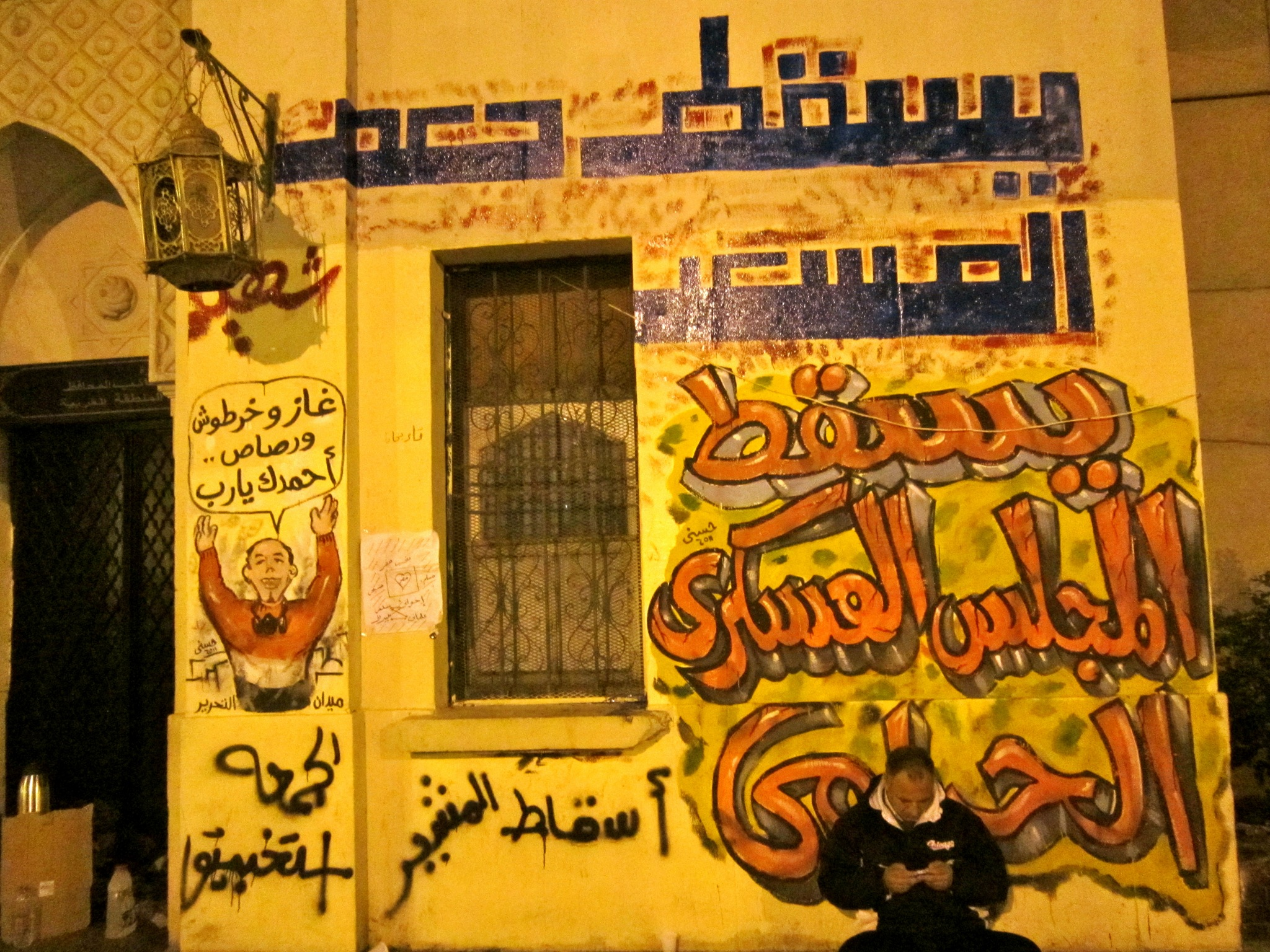
Down With The Military Rule(Graffiti)

During the Arab Spring revolutions, and in the years leading up to them, graffiti was commonly used as a form of popular protest. Street art was an effective way to spread the message of political rebellion, since it is in public view. Furthermore, since authoritarian Arab leaders had poured significant resources into public beautification projects in order to demonstrate their absolute ownership of the public space, street art was a way for the people to reclaim that public space. During the Arab Spring, street art became a prominent form of protest in many Arab countries, including Egypt, Tunisia, Libya, and Syria. An earlier example of this reclamation of public space is graffiti painted during the Palestinian intifada during the late 1980s. While Israeli state censorship prevented the production of a lot of Palestinian protest art, Palestinians were able to paint graffiti in order to spread their message without being stopped by the state. Also, the anonymity of the art form made it a stand-in for the collective spirit of Palestinians.

In Egypt, street art was not a widespread phenomenon before the January 25, 2011, but it quickly became one of the most powerful tools of the revolution. In the first days of the revolution, street art was largely used to mock then-president Hosni Mubarak. However, Egyptian graffiti quickly expanded into a number of spaces, mediums, and genres. Popular types of revolutionary graffiti include political satire, mocking political and military leaders, murals depicting pharonic and biblical themes, tags for social and political movements such as the April 6 Youth Movement and the Ultras, and martyr paintings. These various types of images are meant to critique the political order, incite anger, connect Egyptians with the past, and inspire solidarity for the revolutionary movement.

=== Female graffiti ===
In spite of the great proliferation of protest graffiti during the January 25 revolution, it remained a largely male space, with men dominating the street artist community and very few pieces depicting women. To counter this, movements such as the Graffiti Harimi project (the predecessor of Women on Walls) sought to increase the visibility of women in the public space by increasing the number of female figures in graffiti, with the intention of proving that women are worthy partners in the revolution. Female street art also serves the purpose of spreading political statements against the abuse of women. One recent denizen of the female graffiti scene supported by Women on Walls is Laila Ajjawi, who has garnered international press for her activities in the UNRWA-run Palestinian refugee camp outside of Irbid, Jordan.

== The project ==
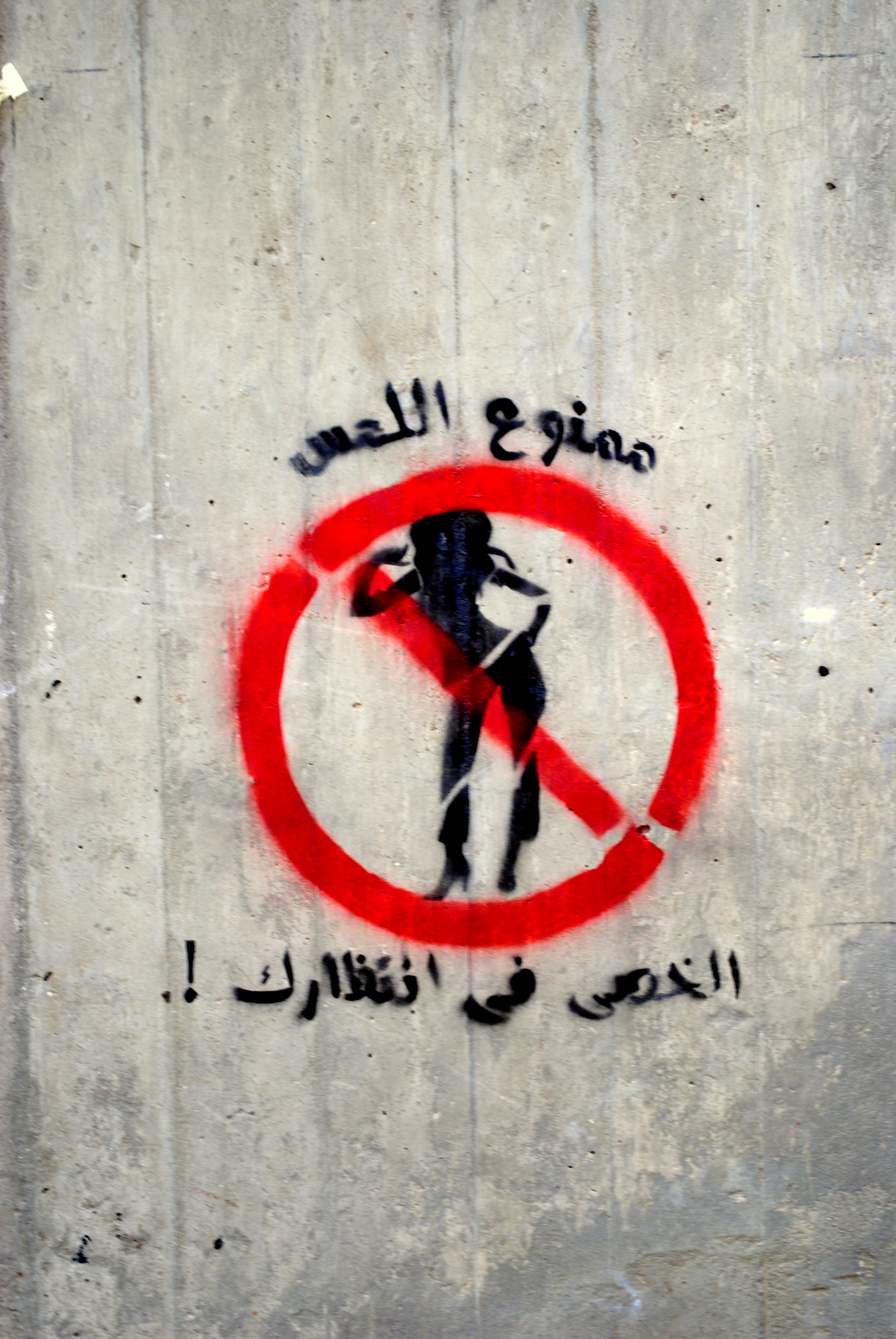
Anti-Sexual Harassment Graffiti in middle east

=== Mission ===
Despite the fact that women were early leaders in the January 25 Revolution, within months of the initial revolution women began to be excluded from protest spaces and political processes, and violence against women proliferated in revolutionary spaces such as Tahrir Square. This development, coupled with the already high rate of sexual assault in Egypt and prevailing stereotype that women were not as capable as men, inspired the Women on Walls project. The project seeks to educate the public on the status of women and promote women's rights through the medium of street art. From the project's Facebook page: "We are using art to discuss one of the most important topics in Egypt, women's empowerment, and which involves many different issues, including the political, the social, the economic and the cultural."

=== Directors ===
==== Mia Gröndahl ====
Mia Gröndahl is a Swedish journalist and street art documentarian who has lived in Egypt since 1996. She first became interested in graffiti when she lived in Gaza prior to moving to Egypt. After the advent of the January 25 Revolution, she spent over a year and a half documenting revolutionary street art in Egyptian cities for her book Revolution Graffiti: Street Art of the New Egypt. It was through her research for this book that she was inspired to promote female graffiti; of the 17,000 pieces of street art she documented, only 253 of them included images of women. Of her motivation to start the project, she stated, "'I felt there's was a need to support female artists, and there's a very strong need to address women's issues. Egypt is one of the worst countries when it comes to women's rights." Her published works include Revolution Graffiti, In Hope and Despair: Life in the Palestinian Refugee Camps (2003), Gaza Graffiti: Messages of Love and Politics (2009), and Tahrir Square: The Heart of the Egyptian Revolution (2011).

==== Angie Balata ====
Angie Balata is the local cultural manager for the Women on Walls Project. She worked with Gröndahl on Revolution Graffiti, documenting pieces, networking with street artists, and providing translations. Upon completing the book, the two women collaborated to expand the book launch into a larger exhibition, which became WOW.

=== First Edition ===
The first Women on Walls campaign was launched in April 2013, with nearly 40 artists participating, in the cities of Cairo, Alexandria, Luxor, and Mansoura. Each city had a separate campaign led by well-known local graffiti artists: Mira Shihadeh and Zeft led the Cairo campaign, Ammar Abo Bakr led the Luxor campaign, Mohamed Khaled and Ghadir Wagdy led the Mansoura campaign, and Aya Tarek, Yazaan El Zo'bi, and Mohaned Nor led the Alexandria campaign. The campaigns were divided into two parts. The first part brought street artists to the town of Anafora for gender-related workshops, to learn about gender sensitive issues and work on how to discuss these issues in the street. In the second part, the artists returned to their respective cities to design pieces reflecting what they learned in the workshops. At the end, the project held a closing ceremony for final remarks and analysis of the finished work.

Notable participants included:

- Abo Bakr
- Hanaa El Degham
- Ahmed Abdallah
- Ahmed Tony
- Sad Panda
- Mohamed El Moushir
- the Mona Lisa Brigades

=== Second edition ===
The second campaign ran from February 8 to February 15, 2014, with 15 participating artists. Due to limited funds, the 2014 campaign only ran in Cairo. As with the first campaign, participants attended seminars and workshops with artists and feminist activists, including Cecilia Uddén, Carolina Falkholt, Radwa Fouda, Lamis Soleiman and Ismail Shawky, and then collaborated upon painting women into the public space. In addition, the second campaign partnered with organizations such as Egyptian feminist organization Nazra, and anti-harassment organization HarassMap in order to further educate participants on women's rights issues specific to Egypt.
