= Arts of the Arab Spring =

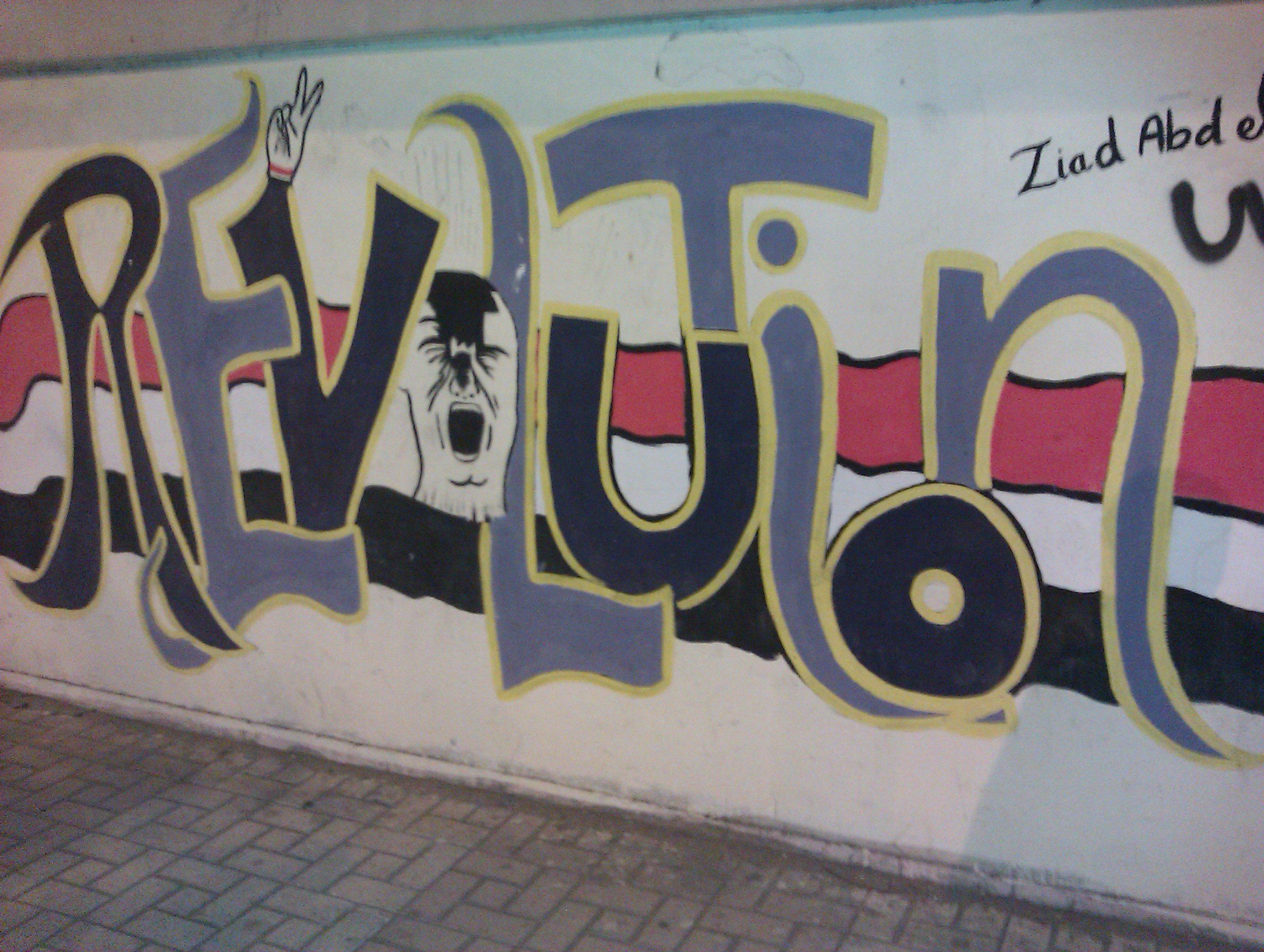
Artwork found on a wall lining a street in Alexandria, Egypt shortly after the revolution of 2011.

Artistic expression played a pivotal role during and following the 2011 uprisings commonly known as the Arab Spring, also known as the First Arab Spring. Common mediums included cartoons, street art (graffiti/murals), and music. Many artworks centered around themes such as governmental corruption, police violence, political Islam, censorship, workers’ rights, and authoritarianism, among others. These works were often met with governmental suppression and violence.

== Tunisia ==
The Tunisian revolution or Jasmine Revolution was the first of the series of revolutions that came to be known as the Arab Spring. This revolution began after the public self-immolation of Mohamed Bouazizi, a Tunisian street vendor. During the uprisings that took place in late 2010, and in the immediate aftermath of the ousting of long time president Zine El Abidine Ben Ali, art played an integral role in creating a revolutionary atmosphere. Street art was particularly pervasive and important during this time, but other mediums like hip-hop music and political cartoons were also conveyors of political messages. This anti-establishment art movement emerged during and right after a time when political speech was heavily repressed.

=== Images of Bouazizi ===
Although Bouazizi's self-immolation was not directly recorded, renderings of Bouazizi and his extreme act of protest were widely spread throughout Tunisia during the revolutionary period. A video of masses protesting immediately after he was taken away in an ambulance, posted by his cousin, went viral on Facebook bringing attention to the incident. An image of President Ben-Ali visiting a comatose and completely bandaged Bouazizi in a hospital in the days after the incident became renowned across the country and world. These, and similar images circulated online, spurring revolutionary sentiment. Outside of images of his self-immolation, Bouazizi became an icon of the Tunisian revolutionary movement. He was depicted in political cartoons as a catalyst for change and peace, as well as in portraiture representing him as a hero in life.

=== Street art ===
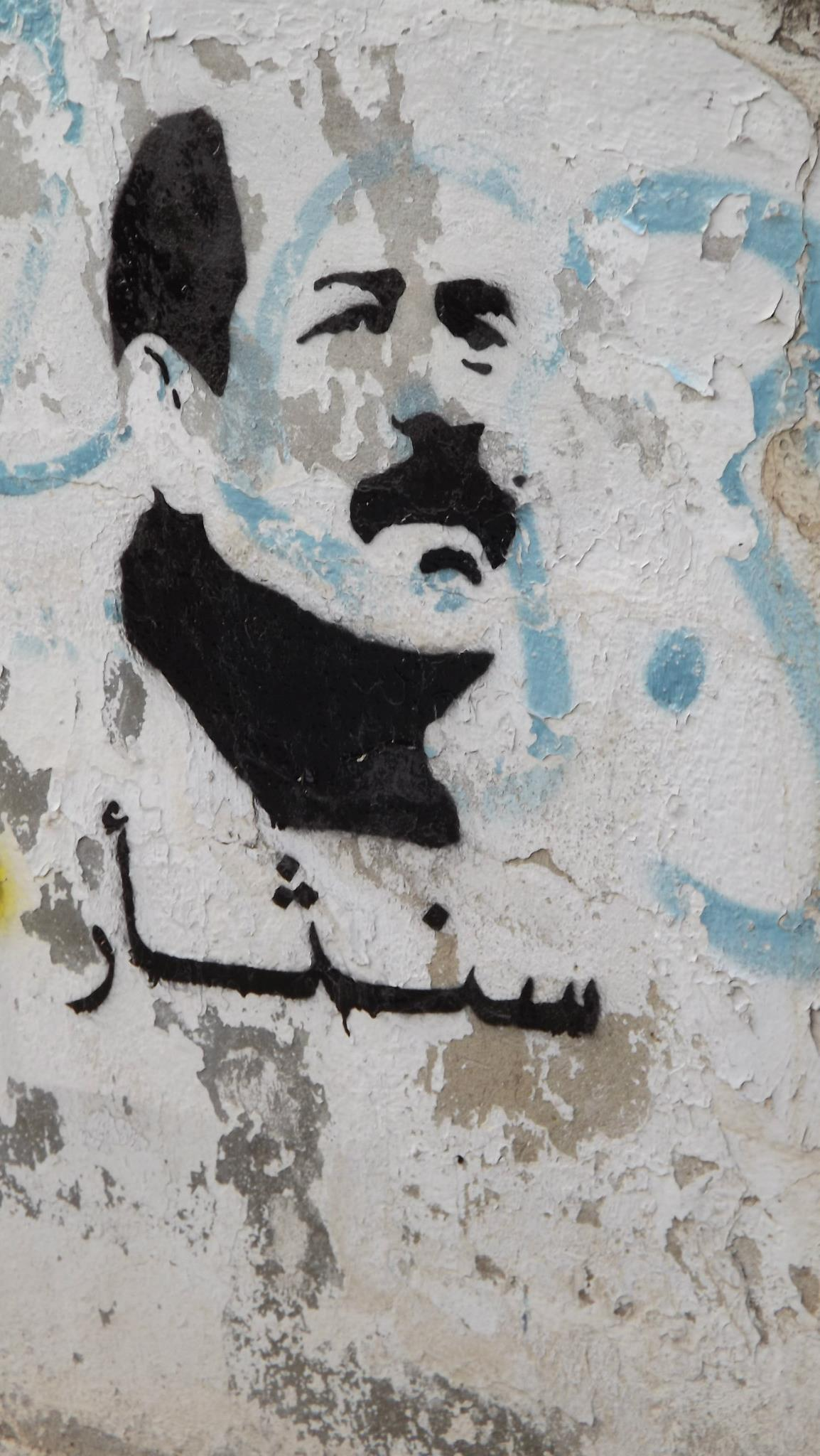
Street art of a Tunisian revolutionary figure.

Street art, particularly graffiti, became widely used and politically important during the Jasmine Revolution in Tunisia. Graffiti existed prior to the uprisings, but was largely non-political and on a much smaller scale. As mass protests began, images of Che Guevara and the hammer and sickle were often painted on walls. Anti-imperialist and anti-establishment messages were extremely popular, often criticizing Ben-Ali or his party the Democratic Constitutional Rally (RCD). Graffiti artists often worked anonymously or in groups to protect themselves from retaliation. Street art was used to convey a wide range of messages. Often, street art was used to reclaim public space as a space for the people rather than controlled by the government. Statues and posters of Ben-Ali were destroyed or taken down and replaced with art. Three months after he fled Tunisia, portraits of 100 ordinary Tunisians were posted around the city of Le Kram replacing those of the ousted president. Destroyed prisons that once held political prisoners and mansions that belonged to members of Ben-Ali's family were covered in murals by graffiti artists. Graffiti was also often used as a criticism of repression under Ben-Ali's leadership, with artists writing "404 Not Found" over his face. This message would often come up when searching the internet for anything deemed undesirable or inappropriate by RCD. Street art would also often depict protesters who had died at the hands of police violence, or celebrations of revolution.

=== Music ===
Hip-hop music was also an important site of resistance messaging. Rap music, already popular among young Tunisians, became a medium of protest against Ben-Ali in the months leading up to his arrest, launching the genre to new levels of popularity. "Rais Lebled" by El General (Hamada Ben-Amor) went viral internationally just weeks before protests began. This song addressed inequality and corruption within Ben-Ali's government, and contributed to growing dissatisfaction within Tunisia. Themes of police brutality, sexism, poverty, and censorship were discussed through song lyrics and associated music videos.

=== Cartoons ===
Political cartoons were shared most prolifically on social media after the protests ended. Cartoons depicted hope for peace and the new electoral system, fear of radicalism, and disagreement over how the country should move forward. Cartoonists represented pride in Tunisia's successful revolution, metaphorically showing Tunisia as a sole red rose in a barren landscape. Willis from Tunis, a cat cartoon character created by Nadia Khiari, also became an internet sensation. The Willis from Tunis cartoons published to Facebook documented the aftermath of the revolution, and celebrated a Tunisia free of censorship.

== Syria ==
The Syrian revolution, or Syrian Revolution of Dignity, was a major political movement from 2011 to 2012 consisting of mass protests and uprisings. Syria was one of the many countries to revolt against their leaders in the larger movement known as the Arab Spring. The main goal of the uprising was the ousting of Syrian president Bashar al-Assad from office, with protesters often relying on humor and mockery to demean the leader and call for freedom. Common forms of art during the Syrian Revolution include short films, music, and cartoons.

=== Satire ===
Satirical commentary was commonly used during the Syrian revolution as a means of political critique, often focusing on self-mockery, humor, and exaggeration. Satire was also used as a medium for political critique in the form of video. Top Goon: Diaries of a Little Dictator was a series of short videos posted on YouTube beginning in November 2011 by the Syrian puppet theater group called Masasit Mati. The videos, with Arabic dialogue and English subtitles, featured a highly exaggerated depiction of Bashar al-Assad as a puppet. With an elongated face, an oversized pointed nose, and bushy eyebrows, the puppet version of the president is referred to as "Beeshu," a diminutive form of "Bashar." Through five to eight-minute episodes, the leader is repeatedly mocked through the puppet's high-pitched laugh accompanied by Bashar's infamous lisp. He is portrayed as a power-hungry dictator, often infantilized as a narcissistic, childlike leader. The director of Masasit Mati, Jamil (pseudonym), told Al-Jazeera: "We tried to break the glorified image of the dictator." Season 1 of Top Goon was composed of 13 episodes. A Season 2 was posted from July to November 2012 and featured 17 episodes.

=== Music ===
One of the most powerful songs of the uprising was "Yalla Erhal Ya Bashar" ("Come on Bashar, Leave"), written in August 2011 by Hama-based Ibrahim Qashoush. The song calls for the ejection of the Syrian president, Bashar al-Assad, and his brother, Maher, from office:

Oh Bashar, you are not one of us, take Maher and leave us.

Your legitimacy here has ended

Come on, Bashar, leave us

Bashar, you are a liar, to hell with you and your speech

Freedom is at the door

Come on, Bashar, leave us

Oh Mahir, you are a coward and you are an American agent

The Syrian people will not be humiliated

Come on, Bashar, leave us

Bashar, fart on you and on those who support you

We can’t even look at you

Come on, Bashar, leave us

Bashar, stop running around, your blood will be shed in Hama

Your mistakes will not be forgiven

Come on, Bashar, leave us

Bashar, you are an infiltrator, fart on you and on the Ba’th Party

Go fix your lisp

Come on, Bashar, leave us

Syria wants freedom

We will topple Bashar with our strong will

Syria wants freedom

Without Mahir and Bashar and all this savage gang

Syria wants freedom

The song's popularity was intensified further after Qashoush's body was discovered in a river with his vocal cords ripped out days after performing his song in front of a crowd. The artist became a martyr for the revolution and his songs spread throughout Syria, uniting people under the call for liberation.

=== Cartoons ===
Political cartoonist Ali Farzat, who openly criticized Assad's government in his work, was one of Syria's most prominent political cartoonists during the 2011 uprisings. In August 2011 he was pulled from his car and severely beaten by regime forces, leaving his hands broken. The artist survived and continued making art. He later posted a cartoon of himself lying in a hospital bed holding up an obscene gesture with his bandaged hands. With a swollen, bruised eye and scratches down his face, the cartoon shows Farzat wrapped in hospital linens against a black background, his eyes pointed straight towards the viewers.

== Egypt ==
Prior to the 25 January Revolution, the Egyptian government largely restricted public political expression in public spaces. Street art quickly became the dominant form of political visual expression in Egypt as protests unfolded across the country. Artists used street art to create visual documentation of the protests that occurred throughout the revolution in real time. Shifts in the power dynamics between citizens and the state bolstered the democratization of art through street art in public spaces. People felt more open to expressing thoughts on society, religion, and politics more openly, challenging the conservative Egyptian socio-political status quo.

On Mohamed Mahmoud Street, a main road leading directly to Tahrir Square, a long wall outside of the old American University of Cairo campus quickly became the prominent site for both revolutionary street art and violence. Nicknamed "Martyr’s Road" by activists, Mohamed Mahmoud Street became a place for artists to comment on social and political ideas and also memorialize victims of state violence, particularly liberal protestors killed in the 2011 revolution.

Music was an important tool used at protests to remind protestors of the purpose of the revolution. Musicians composed improvised songs that incorporated witty criticisms of political figures with popular slogans chanted during the revolution. Musicians would sing these revolutionary songs alongside the hundreds of thousands of people present at Tahrir Square, the main site of the 2011 revolution. These songs went viral on social media which helped the revolution garner greater support in Egypt and around the world.

=== Street art ===
Egyptian artists and anonymous citizens began to make street art as a mode for self-expression. Creating street art allowed citizens to "reclaim" their public spaces and thus their country. It empowered citizens to take control of narratives surrounding the revolution as well as visualizing individuals’ sentiments regarding the major social and political upheaval the country was experiencing.

Egyptian street artists used murals and graffiti to memorialize protestors killed at Tahrir Square. The extensive art depicting martyrs aimed to serve as a continuing visual reminder of the revolution in Egyptian collective memory. Artists painted large portraits of victims, oftentimes depicted with wings in heaven, on the walls that lined Mohamed Mahmoud Street that would loom over the passerby that walked past them. Dates and locations of their deaths as well as related poems and quotes often appeared near these memorials.

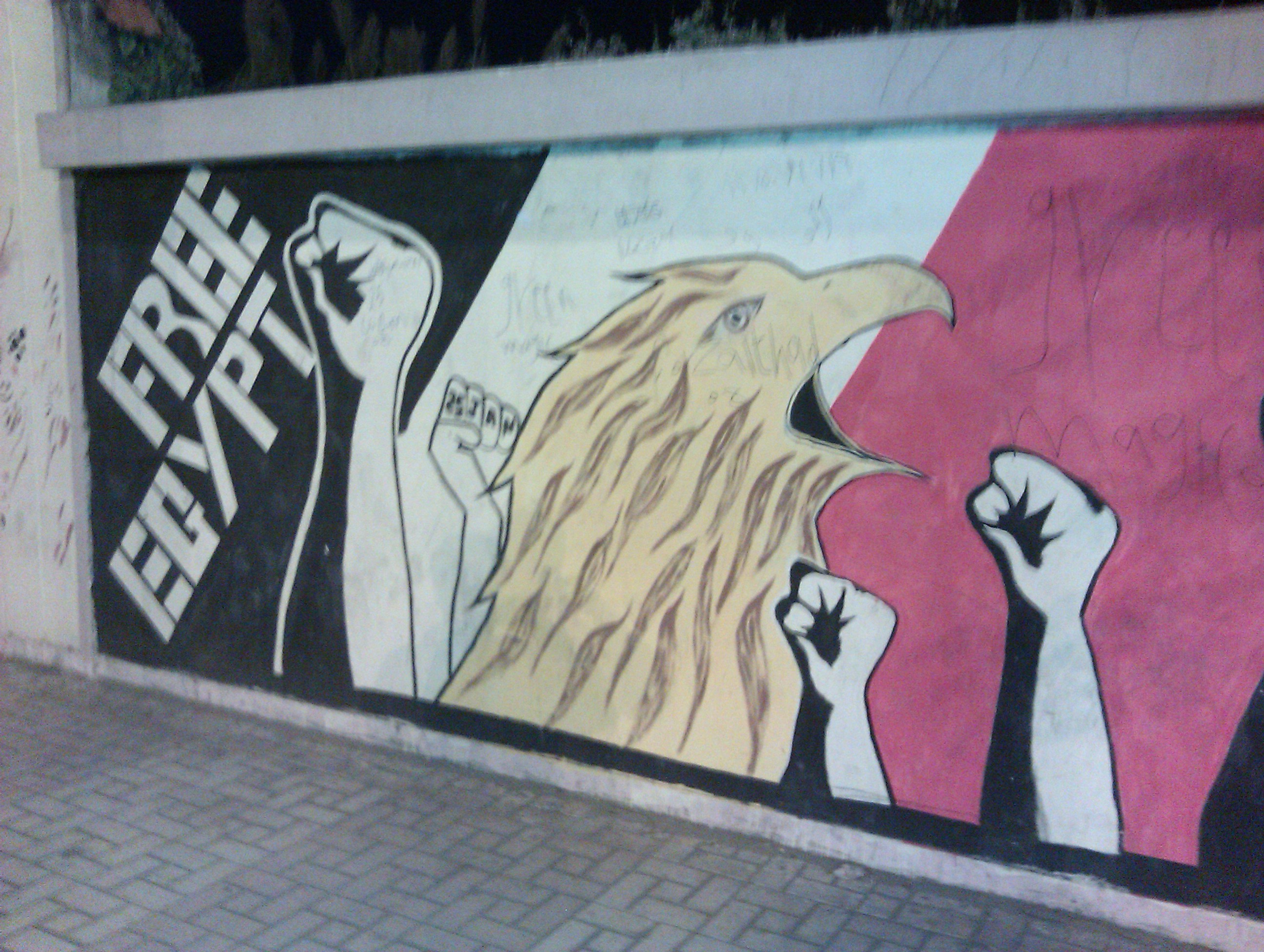
Egyptian Revolution – Wall Art – Free Egypt

Graffiti served as a medium for citizens to express their criticisms about the Mubarak regime, visualize commentary on social and political affairs, and proclaim solidarity with other burgeoning revolutions occurring across the Arab world. Initial graffiti after the start of the 25 January revolution expressed citizens' desires for political change. While some of this was written in English, possibly to garner an international audience, the majority of graffiti was written in colloquial Arabic and involved specific Egyptian cultural references. Common graffiti included remarks about national pride and unity, as well as hope for Egypt's future.

Iconic visual symbols of the revolution emerged out of incidents that occurred at Tahrir Square during protests. One of the most notable emblems of the 2011 revolution is the eyepatch. A soldier, nicknamed the "eye sniper," deliberately shot protesters in their eyes. In response, teenage protestors began to wear eye patches as an act of solidarity. Street art quickly followed suit, depicting portraits of people who lost their eyes in the protests. Graffiti was written on Mohamed Mahmoud Street declaring it as sharei’ uyuun al-hurriyyah, "the Street of the Eyes of Freedom." Many individuals depicted on the street began to appear wearing eye patches.

In December 2011, a female protester was brutalized by soldiers who dragged her abaya, revealing her blue bra. Witnesses shared videos of the incident online which quickly went viral and resulted in national and international outcry. The blue bra soon became a widely graffitied symbol. Not only did it call attention to the militarized violence against liberal protestors, it highlighted the violence, particularly sexual abuse, perpetrated against women by the police and in Egyptian society at-large. Blue bra graffiti became ubiquitous in street art spaces which scholars say also marks a change in Egyptian culture regarding how social taboos are confronted in the traditionally conservative society. A popular theme amongst Egyptian revolutionary street art was the incorporation of ancient Egyptian aesthetics and motifs into visual narrations of current events. Alaa Awad, an Egyptian artist, is known for painting neo-pharaonic murals depicting scenes of protest during the 2011 revolution. The mix between the ancient Egyptian painting style and the modern circumstances is meant to draw attention to the beauty of Egypt's heritage and foster pride in the Egyptian identity.

During and after the revolution, street artists used satire and sardonic humor to criticize Egyptian political figures and organizations; this includes President Mubarak and his former regime, President Morsi, Muslim Brotherhood, Supreme Council of the Armed Forces (SCAF), security forces, among others. After the Mubarak regime was ousted, the SCAF and Muslim Brotherhood continued to censor street art by painting over it. Egyptian street artists responded by painting portraits of half-Mubarak-half-Tantawi caricatures to illustrate frustration against the continuance of authoritarian rule in Egypt. Other artists took inspiration and would replace the non-Mubarak half of the caricatures’ with other leaders or aspiring leaders to highlight that the revolution did not bring about liberal political changes protesters hoped for. Graffiti artists used colloquial Arabic to write slogans like "The brotherhood are sheep" and painted President Morsi as a hand puppet to visualize discontent and distrust of the new government.

=== Music ===
As hundreds of thousands of Egyptians gathered in Tahrir Square to voice their disapproval of Mubarak's regime, protest songs quickly became an important way to unify protestors. The lyrical content of these songs highlighted the purpose of the protests and recalled shared memories to strengthen ties to Egyptian culture and history.

A common theme among protest songs were their underlying themes of nationalism, typically referring to Egypt's past revolutions. Sayyid Darwish's music was sung by revolutionaries during the 1919 and 1952 revolutions. Darwish's "Biladi, Biladi, Biladi," the Egyptian national anthem, was a popular song chanted at Tahrir Square in the early days of the 2011 revolution.

Present at the protests at Tahrir Square in the initial months of the revolution, Ramy Essam began to spontaneously create songs out of the large crowd's chants. He incorporated elements of modern music and slogans of the current revolution with references to Egypt's tradition of resistance. He used satirical humor in many songs to mock Egyptian politicians and leaders, like Mubarak and his son, Gamal. Hundreds of thousands of protesters would sing his songs alongside him at Tahrir Square; videos of Essam's songs quickly went viral on social media.

== Iraq ==
Art during the 2011 Iraqi protests took many forms across various mediums, emanating from public unrest surrounding government corruption and dissatisfaction, in addition to the lingering effects of the 2003 invasion by the United States. In the streets, protestors created motifs of resistance and a shared national identity with signs and banners. Politically charged cartoons, poetry, and music saw a resurgence within the youth resistance movement, catalyzing support throughout the provinces of Iraq.

=== Pre-Arab Spring art in Iraq ===
In the years leading up to the 2011 Arab Spring, Iraqi protest art was influenced heavily by reactions to American occupation and commentary on the discontent of the Saddam Hussein regime. Kareem Risan's book, Every Day, captures the sentiment shared by many Iraqis before 2011, protesting the frequency at which violence was occurring following the invasion. The book, drenched in red paint, creates an image that resembles the aftermath of a car bomb; blood-red pages, covered in tire marks, are littered with everyday items crushed in the periphery.

=== Flags, banners, and signs ===
While the art of the 2011 protests largely moved away from the studio and into the streets, the sentiment encapsulated by artists like Kareem Risan remained. The political demands and ideological positions of protests during the Arab Spring in Iraq were represented primarily through posters, flags and banners. The critiques featured through these particular mediums followed a few notable and recurring themes: sectarianism, corruption, Political Islam, worker's rights, and homage to fellow protestors that lost their lives for the cause. The Iraqi flag became synonymous with resistance art during the protests, taking a central role amidst the tension of an inclusive national identity and the sectarianism associated with political Islam. Hazim al-Mali combined the Iraqi flag with an image of the liberty monument in Tahrir Square, a central landmark for the Baghdad demonstrations, expressing the interplay between the visual symbolism of a national identity and the physical act of protest.

=== Poetry, music, and humor ===
Each province in Iraq developed their own way of expressing their ideological dissatisfaction and outrage through art. In Basra, protest art took the form of more traditional mediums, like poetry and music, in addition to jokes and cartoons that aimed to mock both political leaders and politicized religion. Singers and folk poets, catalyzed by youth groups, were brought together by their shared protest ambitions, providing art that laid the foundation for a rebellion against the actors responsible for politicizing all facets of Iraqi life.

== Libya ==
Protest art in Libya centered around themes of anti-government sentiment, national identity, and anti-authoritarian resistance. Much of the art that was created during the uprisings targeted Libyan revolutionary, Muammar al-Qaddafi, alienating him from the common identity shared by protestors, and dehumanizing him as an act of de facto violence.

=== Graffiti ===
Protestors, many armed with spray paints and cans, were able to overwhelm authorities in large public spaces, marking territories with politically charged art and slogans. Graffiti art became a means of controlling streets and other public areas, not unlike forms of physical occupation seen throughout the Arab Spring. Artists covered entire neighborhoods in vibrant paints, covering walls in murals and sprawling anti-government slogans on countless surfaces. The result of this unfettered artistic expression was the creation of large silent-protest sectors that goaded authorities to acknowledge the messaging to cover them up.

=== Critique of Muammar Qaddafi ===
During the uprisings in Libya, artists created harsh depictions of Muammar al-Qaddafi, the de facto leader of the country who referred to himself as "King of Kings of Africa." Artists deployed the use of scathing insults and visual satire by creating exaggerated depictions of al-Qaddafi and displaying them throughout town on posters, wall murals, or cartoons. These depictions quickly evolved to feature ethnic and racial stereotypes, such as enlarging al-Qaddafi's lips, representing his hair as a mess of frizz, comparing him to a monkey or ape, or otherwise portraying the leader as a non-human creature.

== See also ==
- Street art influence in politics
