= Mohamed Mahgoub Azooz =

Egyptian plant physiologist

- محمد محجوب عزوز
- Education: Assiut University (BS 1984, MS 1990) South Valley University (PhD 1997)
- Known for: President of Luxor University (2020–2022); research on plant physiological responses to environmental stress
- Awards: State Prize for Encouragement in Agricultural Sciences; South Valley University Scientific Excellence Award
- Scientific career
- Fields: Abiotic stress, salinity tolerance, antioxidant systems, crop production in arid lands

Mohamed Mahgoub Azooz is an Egyptian Professor of Plant Physiology in Department of Botany, Faculty of Science, South Valley University, Qena, Egypt. He is the Dean of Faculty of Science and one of the "Top 100 Scientists” published by International Biographical Centre, Cambridge-UK in 2011.

== Education ==
Mohamed Mahgoub Azooz obtained both his B.Sc. and M.Sc. from Assuit University in 1984 and 1990, respectively. In collaboration with Tubingen University, Germany, he obtained his PhD from South Valley University, Qena, Egypt in 1997.

== Awards ==
From 2012 to 2015, he was awarded the scientific publication prizes from both king Faisal University and South Valley University. In 2011, he was listed among the top 100 Scientists published by International Biographical Centre, Cambridge-UK and in the same year, his name was included in 28th Edition of Marquis Who's in the World Biography.
