= Mohamed Mahmoud graffiti =

Collection of art and vandalism in Cairo, Egypt

Mohamed Mahmoud Graffiti is a collection of graffiti that was painted on several walls in and surrounding Mohamed Mahmoud street near Tahrir Square in Cairo, Egypt during and after the 2011 Egyptian revolution.

Also known as sharei’ uyuun al-hurriyyah (Street of the Eyes of Freedom), Mohamed Mahmoud Street became the site of several protests following the uprising that saw the resignation of Hosni Mubarak. The graffiti created has responded to and captured these protests, as well as more widely criticising the government and what the artists perceive as the failures of the revolution.

These protests have famously included clashes between protestors and Egyptian police and Central Security Forces (SCAF) from 19 – 24 November 2011, after a sit-in by the families of those killed or injured in uprising in Tahir Square in January and February 2011 were violently dispersed. These clashes were noted for their violence, with over 40 people killed, tear gas used and reports of an 'eye-sniper' that was deliberately targeting protestors’ eyes

Further protests erupted in and surrounding Mohamed Mahmoud Street in February 2012 following the violence that took place at a match between Al-Ahly and Al-Masry football clubs at Port Said that saw 74 killed and over 1,000 injured.

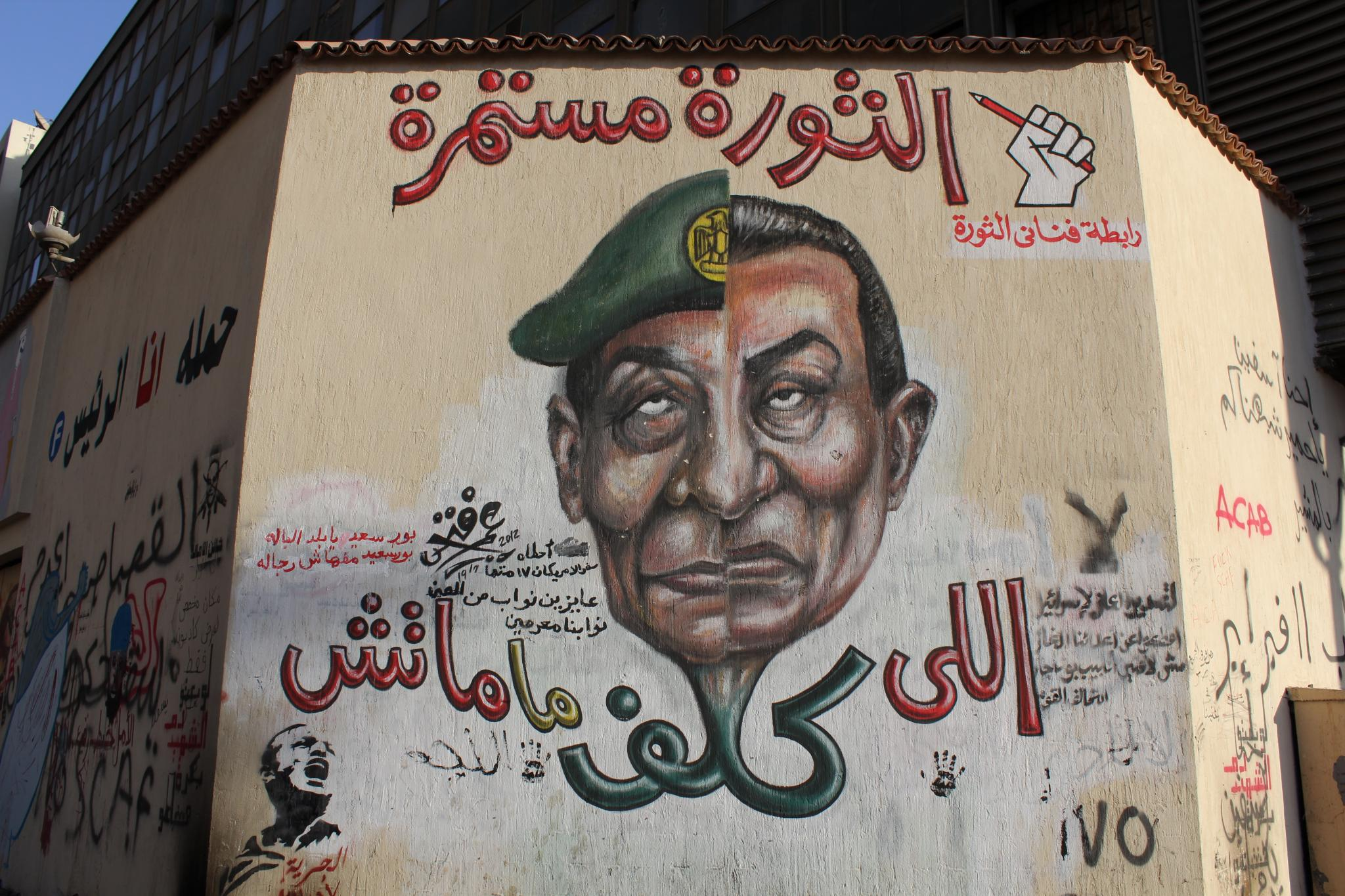
Graffiti depicting Field Marshal Tantawi and President Hosni Mubarak as two sides of the same face

Areas bearing the graffiti included the walls of The American University in Cairo and some buildings and schools surrounding it, and the concrete wall that was installed later in and surrounding Mohamed Mahmoud Street in response to these protests.

== The rise of art activism in Egypt ==
Art activism have had a major influence on the unfolding of the huge political movements that have taken place in Egypt over these years. No art form has represented the enthusiasm and overwhelm of feelings that occurred as a result of Egypt's 2011 revolution as vividly as graffiti. In the beauty of their drawings and bright colours, Some of the graffiti's illustrate a resemblance to the Pharaohs’ graffiti of the past, a major pillar of Egyptian culture and society. Influenced by the rise of graffiti around the globe, Egyptian artists began attempting different styles and sketches, mixing Egyptian-influenced style with famous icons and Arabic calligraphy, as a form of revolt. This artistic rise, both purging and expressing, allowed artists to thrive and create art influenced by the political and social condition of Egypt. Still, danger presents itself, as artists continue to work under oppressive regimes.

== Types of graffiti ==
Mohamed Mahmoud Street has been the site of wide range of graffiti, which has often drawn on and infused multiple artistic traditions from Egyptian history, such as Pharaonic, Islamic and contemporary, to engage in political and social commentary.

This graffiti has included slogans of the Egyptian revolution, demands for the handover of power to civilians and an end to military rule. Qur'anic verses were also painted onto the walls in response to the rise of the Muslim Brotherhood, condemning sins such as pride, power-seeking and hypocrisy. Artists have used this space to create critical and comical renditions of authority figures, such Lieutenant Mahmoud Shinawi or the famous depiction of Field Marshal Tantawi and President Hosni Mubarak, as well as images celebrating revolutionary figures such as Sambo, Mina Danial and Sheikh Emad Effat.

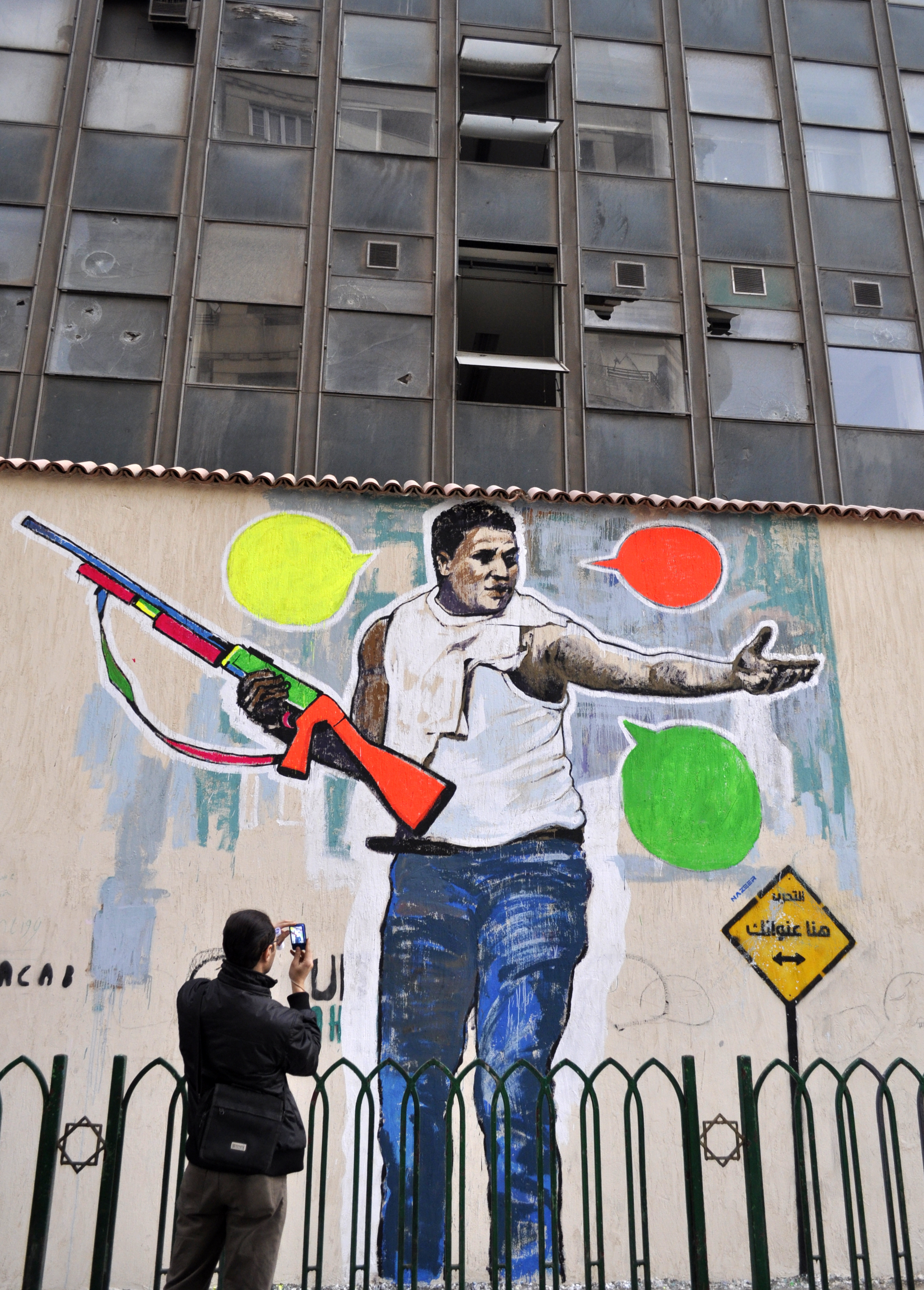

The violence experienced by protestors was also often depicted. This included violence committed against women, such as the blue bra scandal, as well as images of people wearing eye-patches, for example Lost Eyes by Ammar Abo Bakr and depictions of Ahmed Harara, a political activist who lost his second eye during the six days of clashes in November 2011. After many protesters were shot in the eye during these protests, the eye patch became a symbol of resistance to state violence.

Some graffiti represented clashes with Copts in front of the TV building in Maspero in October 2011, the Maspero Massacre.

Mohamed Mahmoud Street especially became an important space for memorialising those who had been killed during and following the Egyptian Revolution. One example of this is Bakr’s Mothers of the Martyrs, which confronts passer-by with the image of a woman holding a picture of her deceased son, likely a reference to the mothers of those killed during the Revolution who were campaigning for the perpetrators to be bought to trial. Famously, faces of members of the Ultras Ahlawy, which formed the majority of the victims of the Port Said massacre were depicted, including in the Al-Naaehaat, Mourning Women or The Funeral mural by Alaa Awad, which shows grieving ancient Egyptian women alongside a sarcophagus representative of those killed in the Port Said violence. This mural also draws on Islamic tradition, depicting the martyrs as having angels wings and ascending to heaven, and became an important site of remembrance with members of the public often visiting and leaving flowers in front of the image.

As this artwork draws on the painting styles of the Ancient Egyptians recorded on the walls of Pharaonic funerary temples, so Mohamed Mahmoud Street graffiti became well known for drawing both on Ancient Egyptian artistic tradition, both through iconography and the scenic manner in which it was laid out. This was particularly prevalent in Awad’s artwork, for example the Marching Women mural, reminiscent of scenes seen on tombs in Luxor. This depicts ancient Egyptian women holding weapon-like items, looking towards a scene of warriors ascending ladder. This work, like many others, situates the current political criticism within the wider narrative of Egyptian history and has been seen as acting to legitimise this struggle in the face of state repression.

"The No Wall" initiative was launched in February 2012. The initiative called on artists to paint on the concrete blocks that authorities installed in the main streets leading to the Interior Ministry and the headquarters of the Egyptian Parliament to make them 'invisible'. Blocks were painted with the "No Wall" slogan and scenes of security forces attacking protesters. Some artists also recreated idealised versions of the streets that lay behind, while others painted ocean views or family scenes as a way to reclaim the streets and create the illusion of open spaces.

== Artists included ==
The drawings on the murals featured then-upcoming artists and activists. "Amr Picasso", one of the graphic artists who participated in the protests of "Mohamed Mahmoud" and witnessed the events that occurred, drew some of the graffiti. One of the most famous works, the General Tantawi and former president Mubarak, was drawn by Egyptian artist Mohamed Fathi.

Two of the most prominent artists to emerge from Mohamed Mahmoud Street are Ammar Abo Bakr and Alaa Awad, both of whom were situated at the Luxor Institute of Fine Art. Bakr started painting on the street after the clashes in November 2011 while Awad painted their first mural on Mohammed Mahmoud following the Port Said massacre. Bakr and Awad often worked in dialogue with each other: for example, in response to Bakr’s depiction of the SCAF as a three headed snake on the walls of the Lycée School, Awad drew ancient Egyptian hostesses confronting the snake. Symbolic of beauty and refinement, Awad also added seven cows, defined as the seven Gods of Hathor or seven heavens with various symbolic meanings, including joy, fortune and a brighter future.

Much of the graffiti done was during the middle of the day, with bystanders participating or prompting varied reactions and debate. The creation of these artworks were also not separated from active participation in the protests, with Bakr and others recorded as painting during the middle of clashes in between throwing rocks at security forces.

== Removal of graffiti ==
The provincial department of Cairo has removed the murals on Mohamed Mahmoud Street several times, frequently doing so throughout 2011 and 2012. It is also reported that the Central Security Forces and the management of the American University participated in such efforts. Some of this graffiti remain documented and even published by admirers who collected photographs taken by visitors during the given time.

The whitewashing of these walls have largely been seen as an attempt to erase the history of the street and stories of the revolution and has often prompted outrage and incited protest in response, with artists quickly returning to paint the street once again. In particular, backlash against the whitewashing of graffiti in September 2012 led to two thousand protestors returning to repaint the walls, the work initially watched by at least seven trucks of riot police who did not intervene and shortly left the scene. The artists and activists held the newly elected President Mohammed Morsi responsible and responded by focusing their artistic criticism on Morsi’s government and the Muslim Brotherhood, including a painting of Morsi’s head on a queen of clubs playing card and a message written by Bakr: ‘Go on erasing, you cowardly regime’, ‘Erase and I will draw again’. Prime Minister Hisham Qandil issued a statement in response distancing the government from this action.

The American University of Cairo made some vocal efforts to conserve the graffiti painted on its walls in March 2012 and have been reported to have stepped in to prevent local officials erasing these murals. However, it was criticised for its decision to demolish at least 40% of one of its walls, that displayed some of the streets most famous murals, to tear down the derelict science building behind it, described by the university as being in line with the Egyptian governments plans to develop and renovate the area.

There has also been debate among the artists themselves about whether the graffiti should be preserved. For example, while many advocated for the preservation of the murals due to their role in memorialising the revolution, with Awad asking the AUC to ‘fix’ the walls to prevent erasure, Bakr expressed the view that the artwork should change to reflect events as they unfolded.

Freedom of expression has always been a challenging issue. President Gamal Abdel Nasser nationalized the press in the 1950s and it has been the case since. Thus, to write or draw in the hope of mobilize opposition has always been under scrutiny, in the fear of revolt.

== Preservation of the graffiti ==
Some photographers successfully attempted to photograph the graffiti that occupied the murals since the outbreak of the January revolution in Egypt and, thus, some of them have been documented and archived in published works and research material such as the documentary book "Land, Land: The Story of the Graffiti Revolution" by writer and photographer Sherif Abdel Majid

== See also ==
- 2011 Egyptian Revolution
- Central Security Forces
- Supreme Council of the Armed Forces
- Arab Spring
- Egyptian Arts post 2011 Revolution
