= Ali Farzat =

Syrian cartoonist

- علي فرزات
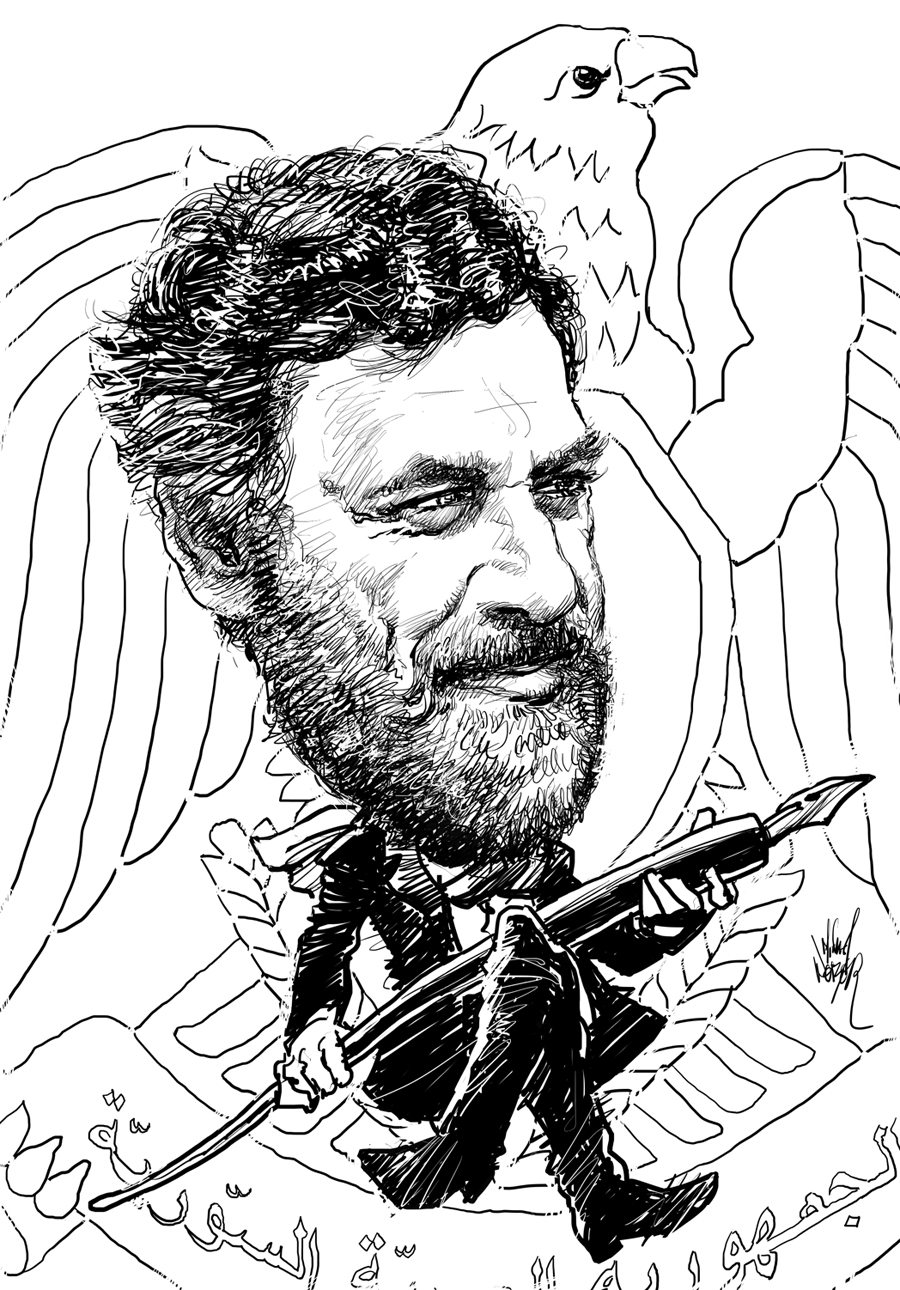
- Ali Ferzat by Michael Netzer
- Born: 22 June 1951 (age 75); Hama, Syria
- Education: University of Damascus
- Known for: Political cartooning
- Awards: Prince Claus Award (2002); Sakharov Prize (2011)
- Website: www.ali-ferzat.com

Ali Farzat (also Ali Ferzat; Arabic: علي فرزات; born 22 June 1951) is a Syrian political cartoonist. He has published more than 15,000 caricatures in Syrian, Arab and international newspapers. He served as the head of the Arab Cartoonists Association. In 2011, he received the Sakharov Prize for peace. Farzat was named one of the 100 most influential people in the world by Time magazine in 2012.

== Life and career ==
Farzat was born and raised in the city of Hama, in central Syria, on 22 June 1951. His first cartoon dealt with the Évian Accords negotiations between Algerians and French officials. In 1969, he began drawing caricatures for the state-run daily, al-Thawra. He enrolled at the Faculty of Fine Arts at the University of Damascus in 1970, but left before completing his studies in 1973. In the mid-1970s, he moved to another government-controlled daily, Tishreen, where his cartoons appeared every day. His caricatures were critical of government corruption but were not directed at particular individuals. International recognition followed in 1980 when he won first prize at the Intergraphic International Festival in Berlin, Germany, and his drawings began to appear in the French newspaper Le Monde. His 1989 exhibition at the Institut du Monde Arabe in Paris, France, led to a death threat from Saddam Hussein, and a ban from Iraq, Jordan and Libya. The drawing that provoked the most controversy was entitled The General and the Decorations, which showed a general handing out military decorations instead of food to a hungry Arab citizen.

Farzat met Syrian president Bashar al-Assad prior to his presidency in 1996. According to Farzat, "He [Bashar] actually laughed at some of the cartoons—specifically at those targeting security personnel—he had a bunch of them with him and he turned to them and said: 'Hey, he is making fun of you. What do you think?'" Afterwards, the two developed a friendship. He has been called "one of the most famous cultural figures in the Arab world". In December 2012, Farzat was awarded the Gebran Tueni Prize in Lebanon.

=== Syrian Civil War ===
During the Syrian Civil War, Farzat became more direct in his anti-government cartoons, specifically targeting government figures, particularly al-Assad. Following the fall of Tripoli in late August to anti-government rebels seeking to topple Libyan leader Muammar al-Gaddafi, Farzat published a cartoon depicting a sweating Bashar al-Assad clutching a briefcase and running to catch a ride with Gaddafi, who is anxiously driving a getaway car. Other cartoons Farzat had published previously include one in which al-Assad is whitewashing the shadow of a large Syrian security force officer while the actual officer remains untouched, with the caption reading "Lifting the emergency law", and another showing al-Assad dressed in a military uniform, flexing his arm in front of a mirror. The mirror's reflection shows Assad as a dominant, muscular figure, contrasting with his actual slim stature.

On 25 August 2011, Farzat was reportedly pulled from his vehicle in Umayyad Square in central Damascus by masked gunmen believed to be part of the security forces and a pro-government militia. The men assaulted him, concentrating mainly on his hands, and dumped him on the side of the airport road, where passers-by found him and took him to hospital. According to one of his relatives, the security forces notably targeted his hands, both of which were broken, and then told Farzat it was "just a warning". His brother As'aad, however, claimed that Farzat was kidnapped from his home at around 5 a.m. by five gunmen and then taken to the airport road after being beaten "savagely". The gunmen then warned him "not to satirize Syria's leaders". The Local Coordination Committee (LCC), an activist group representing the rebellion in Syria, stated that his briefcase and the drawings inside were confiscated by the assailants.

In response to the news of Farzat's ordeal, Syrian opposition members expressed outrage and several online activists changed their Facebook profile picture to that of a hospitalised Farzat in solidarity with the cartoonist. The incident provoked an outpouring of solidarity by cartoonists in the Arab world and internationally. The Egyptian newspaper Al Sharouk's Waleed Taher drew a map of the Arab world with a face emerging from Syria screaming, "They beat up Ali Farzat, World!" Egypt's Al Masry Al Youm published a cartoon depicting a man with two amputated hands, taken aback by how another person guessed that he was a cartoonist. In the Lebanese daily Al Akhbar, Nidal al-Khairy published a cartoon depicting Farzat's broken hand being stabbed by three security men smaller than the hand in size, with the caption reading, "The hands of the people are above their hands." The well-known Brazilian cartoonist Carlos Latuff drew a rifle with a pen as its barrel pursuing a frantic al-Assad.

The United States condemned the attack, calling it "targeted, brutal". According to the BBC's Arab affairs analyst, Farzat's beating was a sign that the Syrian authorities' "tolerance for dissent is touching zero." One month earlier, Ibrahim al-Qashoush, the alleged composer of a popular anti-government song, had been found dead with his vocal cords removed.

Following the attack, Farzat stated that he would no longer meet with al-Assad, although he was unsure whether al-Assad had directly ordered the assault. Farzat said he would continue to criticise al-Assad, stating, "I was born to be a cartoonist, to oppose, to have differences with governments that do these bad things. This is what I do."

== Style ==
Farzat's drawings are centred on themes involving criticism of bureaucracy, corruption and hypocrisy within the government and the wealthy elite. His drawings, typically without captions, are noted for their scathing criticism and for depicting types rather than individuals. Through his cutting caricatures, he gained the respect of many Arabs while drawing the ire of their governments. However, since the uprising in Syria began, Farzat has been more direct in his caricatures, depicting actual figures, including the President of Syria, Bashar al-Assad.

== Collections ==
- A Pen of Damascus Steel: The Political Cartoons of an Arab Master (2005), published by Cune Press
