= Laila Ajjawi =

Palestinian street artist

- ليلى عجاوي
- Born: 1990 (age 35–36); Irbid Camp, Jordan
- Education: Yarmouk University
- Style: Street art
- Movement: Graffiti
- Website: Laila Ajjawi Art on Facebook

Laila Ajjawi (Arabic: ليلى عجاوي, born June 9, 1990) is an activist, graffiti artist, muralist, and digital artist based in Jordan. She is of Palestinian descent, and was born and raised in a Palestinian refugee camp outside of Irbid, Jordan. Her work highlights women living in the Middle East, with a focus on refugees facing discrimination and limited resources in their countries of residence. She has created murals with Women on Walls, a public art project based in Egypt aimed at empowering women through street art.

== Early life and education ==
Ajjawi was born in a Palestinian refugee camp outside of Irbid, Jordan. She is the oldest of six children, and her father is a construction worker. Her family built their house on the site where her paternal grandparents resettled during the Nakba. While her family has cultural ties to Jenin, both of Laila's parents were born and raised in refugee camps. Her interest in street art began when she was 17 years old after being commissioned to paint a mural for a kindergarten.

Ajjawi attended Yarmouk University and studied biomedical physics.

== Career ==
Ajjawi completed her first piece in 2014 in the Ras Al Ain Gallery at a workshop organized by the Women on Walls.

Ajjawi's primary source of income comes from the humanitarian sector, and she has worked as a site supervisor in a refugee camp. She took the humanitarian route as a response to the Syrian crisis, saying her work with Syrian refugees has widened her knowledge of "social life and humanity."

Ajjawi's art highlights issues such as gender-based violence, a lack of women's representation in the workforce, and the ongoing discrimination of Palestinian refugees. She paints murals of strong women as a means to show other women and refugees that they can take control of their lives, despite legal and social opposition. She is strategic in the colors she uses in her art, and uses cool-toned colors to promote a sense of peace and calm.

Ajjawi has discussed the potential difficulties that including political content in her works could cause, and has stated that her art is focused more on social issues, especially women's rights.

Ajjawi has accumulated numerous awards for her art, writing, and short film. One notable work is her 2014 mural Look At My Mind, which she created as part of the Women on Walls project. Look At My Mind questions societal focus on women's appearances.

Other works include a 2021 mural in Irbid titled My country's daughter, and a mural completed in 2023 in celebration of International Women's Day.

Ajjawi has partnered with other leaders that focus on women's empowerment as well. In 2015, she painted a mural for SheFighter, Lina Khalifeh's women-only martial arts training studio in Amman, Jordan.
