= Street art influence in politics =

Street art influence in politics refers to the intersection of public visual expressions and political discourse. Street art, including graffiti, murals, stencil art, and other forms of unsanctioned public art, has been an instrumental tool in political expression and activism, embodying resistance, social commentary, and a challenge to power structures worldwide.

== History ==
Street art's political roots can be traced back to the ancient Roman Empire, where graffiti was used to express dissatisfaction with the ruling elite. In modern times, the evolution of street art has been closely intertwined with the political climate. Throughout the 20th and early 21st centuries, street art has been used as a tool for protest and political expression, playing significant roles in movements such as in Berlin in the 1980s, Civil Rights in the U.S., the protest culture of the 1968 student revolts, and anti-Apartheid activism in South Africa.

== Street art in political expression ==
Street art allows political messages to reach wide audiences. Since it is often located in public spaces, it bypasses traditional gatekeepers of information such as the media or political establishments. This democratic aspect of street art makes it a potent platform for political activism and participation. Political street art often tackles issues like social inequality, discrimination, environmental concerns, war, and corruption, among others.

A famous example of political street art is Banksy, an anonymous England-based street artist, political activist, and film director. His satirical and subversive works combine dark humor with graffiti and have been featured on streets, walls, and bridges in cities throughout the world. Banksy's art often provides commentary on war, capitalism, hypocrisy, and the human condition.

== Impact on politics ==
While the immediate impact of street art on policy changes or political decision-making can be hard to measure, the art form's influence in shaping political discourse is undeniable. It offers an unfiltered, grassroots perspective on political issues that often contrasts with mainstream narratives. Furthermore, political street art can create a sense of community and solidarity, helping to galvanize social and political movements.

The influence of street art in politics also extends to how politicians and governments react to it. The response varies globally, from punitive measures and censorship to appreciation and encouragement, reflecting the political climate and freedom of expression within each context.

== See also ==
- Arts of the Arab Spring
- Protest art
