= Ammar Abo Bakr =

Egyptian graffiti artist

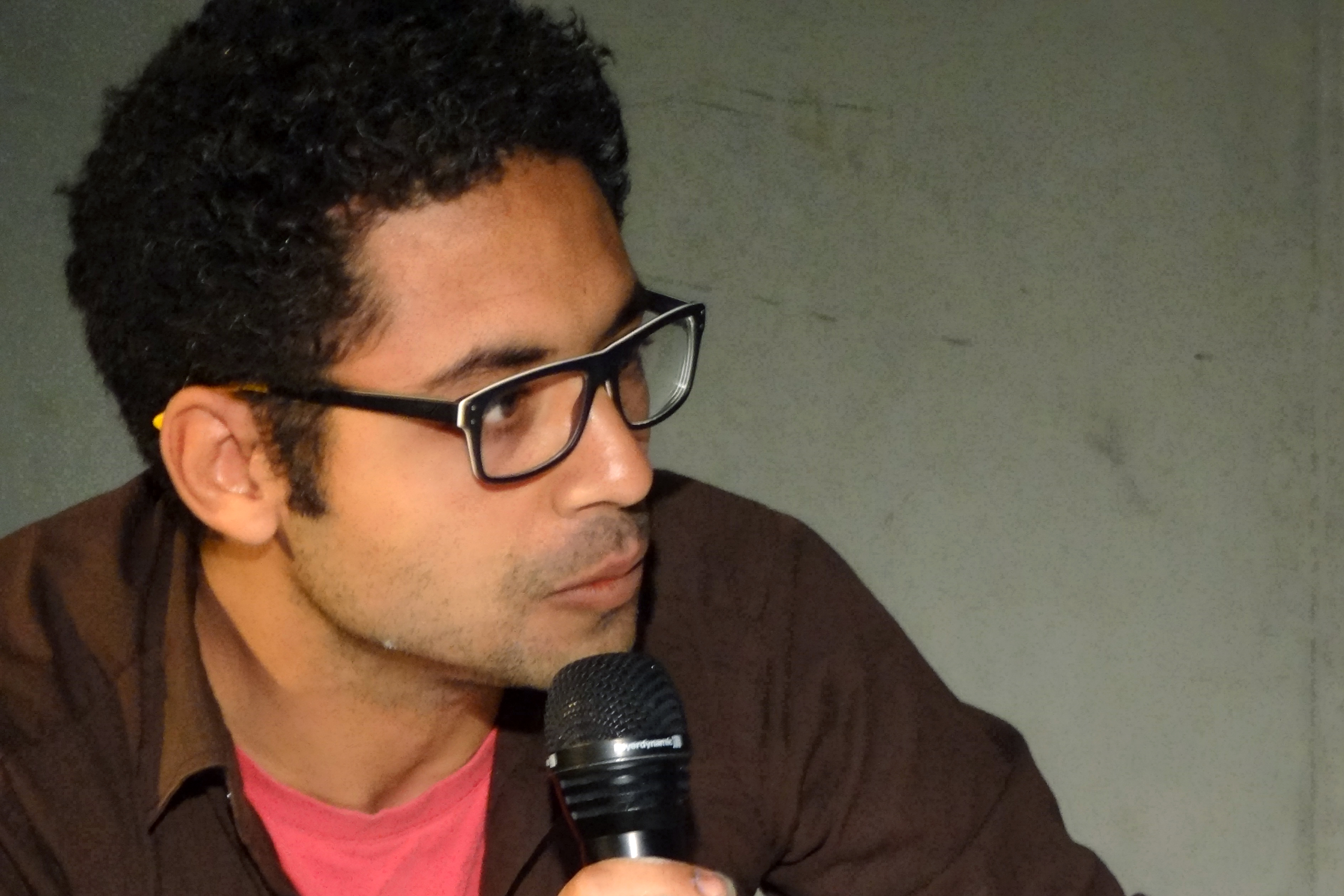
- Born: Ammar Abo Bakr; February 15, 1980 (age 46)
- Education: Faculty of Fine Arts, Luxor University
- Occupations: Artist and professor
- Known for: Mohamed Mahmoud graffiti, street art, graffiti

Ammar Abo Bakr is a visual artist, muralist, graffiti, and installation artist in Egypt. His work depicts the Egyptian Revolution of 2011, portraits, Egyptian history, and Egyptian pop culture, and can be seen on Mohamed Mahmoud Street and in other places in Cairo, Amsterdam, Beirut, Brussels, Berlin, Cologne, Frankfurt, and Tunis.

== Biography ==
Ammar Abo Bakr (aka Dibbanah) is visual, mural, and installation artist from Egypt. His works have cased walls in Cairo, Amsterdam, Beirut, Berlin, Boden, Bonn, Brussels, Cologne, Copenhagen, Frankfurt, Helsinki, Linz, Paris, Rabat, Tripoli, and Tunis.

Ammar Abo Bakr was born on February 15, 1980. Born in Minya, Upper Egypt, he attended Luxor Faculty of Fine Arts from 1996 to 2001, and beginning in 2004 until 2012, has been Assistant Professor at the Faculty at Luxor University, after his graduation in Painting in 2001 at the Luxor University.

His work as a draftsman for the Asyut Project from 2003 to 2012 led to his perception of the Egyptian landscape as an open museum. The Egyptian-German archaeological fieldwork and excavation brought him into contact with Ancient Egyptian everyday artefacts and further undergird his artwork as a form of archiving.

In 2007, Abo Bakr and the late architect and writer Assem Abdel Hamed set up The Mahrousa Association for Preserving Heritage and Contemporary Art in Upper Egypt. Bringing together a collective of outsider artists, the Association engages the meeting point between the built-forms of architecture and popular creative practices such as "hajj wall paintings" and mud- brick houses.

From that time (2004) onwards, Abo Bakr began to archive through drawings the popular festive practice of the moulid in Egyptian cities and its rural backspaces. Witness to and inspired by the artistic expressions of the moulid community, he began collecting spiritual guns, boats, and other animated objects stylized into a form of performance art by the participants in the moulid. These objects further inform his large-scale interventions and site-specific art installations at the festivity in collaboration with a set of outsider artists in and from the moulid since 2016. His repertoire of murals, video and film projects, and visual artwork ties together a situated, magical realistic, visual lexicon of and for the moulid.

== Creative works ==
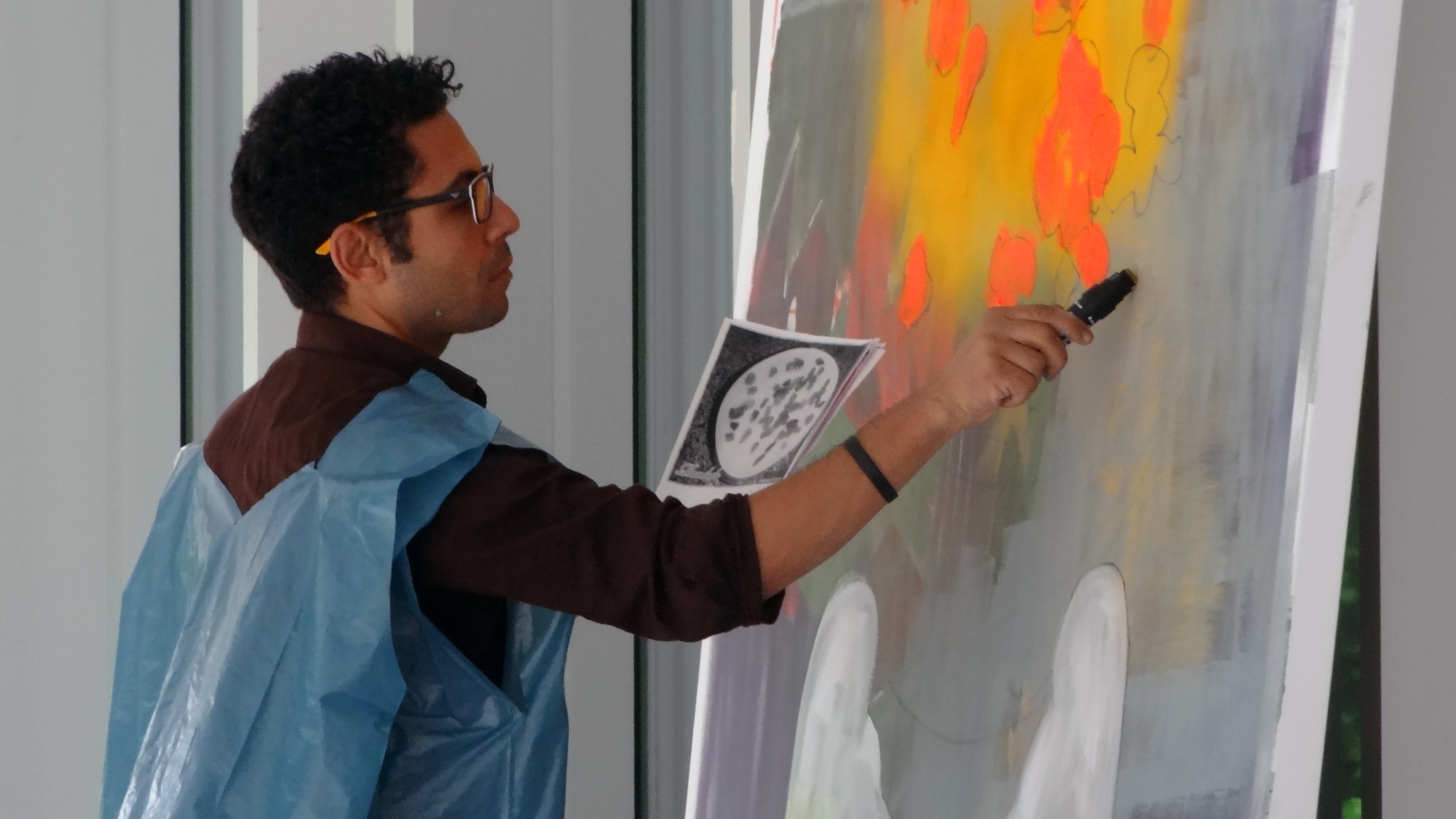
Ammar Abo Bakr, 2012

His artwork is influenced by Sufi, Coptic, Ancient Egyptian, and predynastic Egyptian aesthetics. His murals depict the history of Egypt, Islamic culture, and became a site of debate and discussion during the Egyptian Revolution of 2011, with some on Mohamed Mahmoud Street, close to Tahrir Square, where the January 25 revolution occurred: "The murals borrow from and weave together many different Egyptian artistic influences such as Pharaonic reliefs, Coptic manuscripts, frescos, and folkloric village paintings. In the end, they create a world of martyrs with Coptic wings, Hathors, flying fellaha Buraqs, lotuses, Quranic verses, Azhari Sheikh, and serpent monsters."

During and shortly after the Egyptian Revolution of 2011, with Mohamed Mahmoud Street connecting Tahrir Square and the Ministry of the Interior, Abo Bakr's graffiti on this street reflected events that were happening during the revolution. When writing about his work, Abo Bakr noted, "What we did in Egypt in recent years was not about presenting art, at least it wasn't to me: We used walls as a newspaper... Me, I was a fine arts assistant professor. I left the faculty of arts to report on the revolution in the city’s walls."

In 2012, Abo Bakr, along with other artists started the "No Walls" campaign, aiming to cover government-erected concrete barricades with graffiti. The graffiti included murals and paintings of the continuation of the street behind the barricades. The goal of the campaign was to use trompe-l'œil to make it appear as if the barriers were not there.

Since 2016, Abo Bakr has also combined contemporary pop culture and the cultural environment of members of the mawlid community in Egypt into art, video and film projects for which he creates large scale interventions and site-specific installations, including an art exhibition in downtown Cairo "Where is the Fun in Contemporary Art" and another in a public bathhouse in old Egypt "Hamam El Talat". His installations employ mix-media, sculpture and fabric and light installations, as well as painting.

Abo Bakr also created "Perfumed With Mint", a large-scale mural on a residential building in Amsterdam. and has been the Production Designer for the namesake movie, directed by Muhammed Hamdy

His work is also present in Egypt’s contemporary music scene, for which he has created artworks and production design for music videos, including the comeback video of hip hop artist Marwan Pablo "Ghaba" in 2021, and a Belgian-Egyptian collaborative piece featuring Egyptian Mahraganat musician Sadat el-Alamy in 2022, directed by Pauline Beugnies.

Abo Bakr believes that the art in Luxor and Cairo should remain out of galleries because that limits who sees it and because art is constantly changing.

== Publications ==
(ill. Ammar Abo Bakr), Change of Perspective: A Reflection on Archaeological Work in Egypt: the Local Excavators of the Asyut Project. [Perspektivenwechsel: Eine Reflexion archäologischen Arbeitens in Ägypten. Die lokalen Grabungsarbeiter des Asyut Project]. Tina Beck, The Asyut Project 8, Harrassowitz Verlag, 2016.

(featured artwork), Walls of Freedom: Street Art of the Egyptian Revolution, 240p. (ISBN 978-3937946474), curated and edited by Basma Hamdy and Don Karl, 2014.

(ill. Ammar Abo Bakr), Generation Tahrir, Marseille, Le Bec en l'Air, 2016, 168p. (ISBN 978-2-36744-090-3), Ahmed Nagy and Pauline Beugines, 2016.

(cover ill. Ammar Abo Bakr), Creating Spaces of Hope: Young Artists and the New Imagination, Caroline Seymour-Jorn, American University in Cairo Press, 2021.

== See also ==
- Arab Spring
- Contemporary art in Egypt
- Art of ancient Egypt
- Installation art
