= Alaa Awad =

Egyptian artist (born 1981)

- علاء عوض
- Born: 1981 (age 44–45); Egypt
- Education: South Valley University (PhD)
- Known for: Artist, public art, muralist, street art
- Website: alaa-awad.com

Alaa Awad (born 1981) is an Egyptian artist and muralist based in Luxor, Egypt.

Awad is an Egyptian artist and is also known for his public murals in Cairo and Luxor, Egypt. He is well known for his murals created on Mohamed Mahmoud Street in Cairo, Egypt in 2012 during the Egyptian Revolution, which took media attention. His public murals and paintings encompass the history, dignity and charisma of the Egyptian people. He has worked internationally, in both solo exhibitions for his oil paintings and outdoor public murals.

== Career ==
Awad began his collegiate studies at South Valley University, Faculty of Fine Arts in Luxor, Egypt and graduated in 2004 with a Bachelor of Arts. Afterwards, he began his masters studies at Helwan University, College of Fine Arts in Zamalek, Egypt, while at the same time serving as an assistant lecturer for South Valley University, Faculty of Fine Arts in Luxor Egypt. During these years, Awad spent time between both universities and graduated with a Master of Arts in 2012.

Awad has a PhD degree in Fine arts and is an assistant lecturer in the Department of Mural Painting, for the Faculty of Fine Arts, at South Valley University in Luxor, Egypt. His murals and public art became well known in late 2011 and early 2012 after he took a break from teaching to paint a mural in Cairo. This was at the time that the Port Said Massacre unfolded, which changed the course of his plans and shifted his mural into a memorial mural. What was meant to only be a short period of time in Cairo for Awad then became a much longer time as he continued to paint new murals on Mohamed Mahmoud Street in Cairo.

Awad's PhD dissertation title is, "Artistic Vision Inspired by The Murals of War and Peace in Ancient Egyptian Art" and was released in 2019.

== Style ==
In regards to his murals, Alaa chooses to paint with a brush and uses acrylic paints rather than using stencils and spray paints. His intricate paintings can sometimes take up to a week to complete, not only because of the materials he uses, but because of the complexity of his designs. Awad paints in a neo-pharaonic style, a style that harkens back to Ancient Egypt. His usage of the neo-pharaonic style is meant to draw attention back to the rich, old Egyptian traditions. This style aims to remind the Egyptian people of their heritage and past, a reminder to stay true to their Egyptian identity. His murals are typically multifaceted and multi-layered with each telling a different story.

Beyond the aforementioned unique style of painting, using a neo-pharaonic style aims to return the prominence of public murals in Egypt. Public murals have played a significant role in Egyptian villages in the past, when each village had their own muralist. These muralists would essentially be storytellers of the village and would depict important events or celebrations through traditional imagery and symbolism. Many of these same images can be seen in Awad's artwork today, as he is inspired by the famous works of art from Ancient Egypt that can be seen in temples and museums.

Alaa Awad is also inspired by other ancient Egyptian intangible heritage forms, which are still found in Upper Egypt such as Tahtib ceremonies (Egyptian Arabic: تحطيب taḥṭīb), El Mormah and the daily life of the West Bank in Luxor, Egypt.

== Political and social themes ==
Alaa Awad's public murals were created in Cairo during the Egyptian Revolution and were painted on significant walls including a temporary wall-like roadblock, built to keep protesters away from government buildings. In total, eight walls and seven roadblocks were constructed to keep protesters from Tahrir Square away from the Ministry of the Interior, Ministry of Justice, and Parliament House. The paintings along Mohamed Mahmoud Street reflect the juxtaposition between the ruling power and how their style of leadership has fueled the resistance. A major difference between Awad's public murals and the other street art is that Awad's art is much more subtle because of the neo-pharonic style of his works. While his works will oftentimes directly tie to a social issue, such as gas tank shortages or women's rights, an underlying theme is that Egyptians as a whole must remember their past culture and history stating that "we can't know our future if we forget our past." Awad himself has indicated his own political beliefs stating that "I don't see any change in Egypt's politics, inside or out. I just see that the Muslim Brotherhood has captured the government. They want to change everything according to their own style, to make everything Muslim Brotherhood. They forget to improve things for the public. They have forgotten the people."

== Exhibitions ==
- 2022: An Egyptian Story, Solo Exhibition – State Museum of Egyptian Art, Munich - Germany.
- 2019: The West Bank, Solo Exhibition – Egyptian Cultural Center in Paris, France.
- 2018: EL TAHTIB, Solo Exhibition – Haras National de Lamballe, France.
- 2018: The West Bank, Solo Exhibition – Al-Shomou3 Gallery, Cairo, Egypt.
- 2017: The 3rd Annual Borollus Symposium for Drawing on Walls and Boats, Palace of Arts, Cairo Opera House, Cairo / Egypt.
- 2017: Insight of China International Exhibition Tour – Jordan CAB Art Gallery, Amman / Jordan. Curated by Mohammad Aljaloos.
- 2017: Tour World Of Art, Exhibition at the China Art Museum, Exhibition organized by the Chinese Ministry of Culture, Shanghai / China.
- 2016: Lebanon by Egyptian Eyes, Gallery of Association of Lebanese Artists, Beirut / Lebanon.
- 2016: Summer Collection, Nout Art Gallery, Zamalek / Egypt.
- 2016: CAM Gala Auction, The Contemporary Art Museum in St. Louis / USA.
- 2015: The 8th Luxor International Painting Symposium, Luxor / Egypt.
- 2015: The 2nd Burullus Symposium for Mural Paintings, Cairo / Egypt.
- 2015: Urban art biennial, at the UNESCO World Heritage Site of Völklingen / Germany.
- 2014: Beirut Art Fair, Beirut / Lebanon.
- 2014: Art of the Urban Pharaohs, Queens Hall Parliament House, Melbourne / Australia.
- 2014: Thebes: Peace and Conflict, MCLA Gallery 51, Mural and Solo Exhibition, North Adams / USA.
- 2013: Power of the Powerless, Kunsthalle Baden-Baden / Germany.
- 2013: Torino Lecee Exhibition, The Egyptian Public Library, Luxor / Egypt.
- 2013: How Far Away is the Horizon?, Open-Air Group Exhibition, Holbaek / Denmark.
- 2013: Walls of Resistance, An Exhibition on Street Art and Human Rights in Egypt by Amnesty International, Karlsruhe / Germany.
- 2012: Public Mural, Mohammed Mahmoud Street, Cairo /Egypt.
- 2009: The Egyptian German Friendship Collective Exhibition, SVU-Faculty of Fine Arts and the Library of Alexandria, Luxor / Egypt.
- 2008: Destroying Qurna Village, Marsam Hotel, West Bank – Luxor / Egypt.
- 2007: Qurna Village, Yesterday and Today, Brussels University / Belgium.
- 2017: Egyptian-German Exhibition, South Valley University, Faculty of Fine Arts, Luxor / Egypt

== Mural paintings ==
- 2019: Daughter of the Nile, Egyptian Cultural Center, PARIS / France.
- 2018: Noot – Room 039, street art City de Lurcy-Lévis / France.
- 2017: The 3rd Annual Borollus Symposium for Drawing on Walls and Boats, Mural painting, street art, participating in symposium for mural paintings & paintings on boat 2016 Cairo / Egypt.
- 2016: Memorial for Maat, Project of Cities of Colors, Luxor / Egypt.
- 2015: Burullus, Upper Egypt.
- 2013: Spiritual Art, Brian Flynn, Luxor / Egypt.

== Notable works ==
The Victory Mosaic was designed by Awad in Luxor, Egypt and was constructed with a team under the direction of Awad. The team consisted of students and instructors from South Valley University, Faculty of Fine Arts, Department of Mural Painting. It was inspired from the battle scenes found in Ancient Egyptian site Habu Temple. The material used to construct the mosaic was mosaic and glass. The approximate size is 6 x 4.8 meters. It was installed in late November 2017 on the sports hall building of South Valley University campus in Qena, Egypt. The mosaic took one year to complete.

=== Marching Women ===
Marching Women is a mural which consists of two main components, "women in the funeral march" and "women climb the ladder". This work is based on an original image in the Ramesseum temple in West Bank of Luxor, a photo of engraved battle scenes on the Ramesseum's First Pylon, Thebes. The Ramesseum has some of the Egyptian world's oldest surviving pylons. A pylon, or monumental portal to an ancient Egyptian temple, usually consists of two massive upward tapering walls flanking and perpendicular to the temples entrance. Awad changed it, his painting made women instead of men apparent to the viewer. This work shows the strong role that women played in society in the past of Egypt and today. And we can see his meaning in the women's hands—they have papyrus in their hands, this communicates the meaning of knowledge .

=== Women Climbing the Ladder ===
This work, Women Climbing the Ladder, was based on a scene located at the Ramesseum Temple in Luxor, Egypt. By placing this ancient image in a more modern context it demonstrates how instrumental women were in the past and also in the present. Awad painted this piece to represent the role of women and stated the influence of the battle of Kadesh in which it is located. In this court are well preserved scenes from the battle of Kadesh. Ramesses II dashes into battle (lower row). He is depicted larger than his men, and the enemy, mostly dead and wounded, lie in heaps on the ground. The fortress of Kadesh, surrounded by a moat, divides a group of the enemy from the battlefield. These men, far from preparing themselves for battle, are lending a hand to their drowning companions. Though this mural has been considered by some as a pretentious interpretation, there is no doubt that the complexity of the composition shows development and sophistication. The individual figures, however, indicate marked deterioration from the expressive detail of the murals of Seti I's mortuary temple. Egypt has a long history and its own traditions. This again highlights Awad bringing social issues into the limelight while also reinforcing that Egypt must return to its roots to move ahead.

=== Hostesses ===
On Mohamed Mahmoud street is an extensive image of mural paintings inspired by ancient Egyptian history, painted by Awad in 2012. "The myth of human destruction in ancient Egypt" with hieroglyphic written by Amir Fouad. In fact, however, history as a cultural and social memory could not be more alive in the Egyptian Revolution and its aftermath. The Egyptian Revolution has reinvigorated history on the street in a way that has the capacity to produce change in society. The most intangible evidence of this is in the street murals of Mohammad Mahmoud Street, which incorporated Egyptian art in a way that endows both ancient and modern history with positive meanings. This image was expanded upon by Awad by painting a series of hostesses, or "ladies-in-waiting," which was meant to "portray a centuries" old feminine wisdom with a welcoming smile. This image shows the kindness of the hostess, representing the people, juxtaposed. The position of these figures is inspired by the position of the figures that are nfinished in Tomb of Ramose.

=== Jacket and cover art ===
All Night It Is Morning by Andy Young, November 2014

Soft Force: Women in Egypt's Islamic Awakening by Ellen Anne McLarney ISBN 9780691158488, 9780691158495, 9781400866441, 2015

Daughters of the Nile: Egyptian Women Changing Their World by Samia I. Spencer ISBN 1443894575, 9781443894579 12 December 2016
