= List of works about the Syrian civil war =

The Syrian civil war was an armed conflict that began with the Syrian revolution in March 2011, when popular discontent with the Ba'athist regime ruled by Bashar al-Assad triggered large-scale protests and pro-democracy rallies across Syria, as part of the wider Arab Spring.

Due to its geopolitical and humanitarian impact, the conflict has been represented in various forms of popular culture and media.

== Films ==
- Ladder to Damascus (2013)
- Sniper: Legacy (2014)
- Phantom (2015)
- The Father (2016)
- Insyriated (2017)
- Damascus Time (2018)
- A Private War (2018)
- Sky (2021)
- Palmira (2022)
- The Swimmers (2022)

== Documentaries ==
Documentary films about the Syrian civil war include:

- Saving Syria's Children (2013)
- The Return to Homs (2013)
- Red Lines (2014)
- Silvered Water, Syria Self-Portrait (2014)
- Ghosts of Aleppo (2014), VICE News documentary
- I Want to Live (2015)
- 50 Feet from Syria (2015)
- 7 Days in Syria (2015)
- Our War (2016)
- Peshmerga (2016)
- Salam Neighbor (2016)
- The War Show (2016)
- The White Helmets (2016)
- Last Men in Aleppo (2017)
- A Dangerous Dynasty: House of Assad (2018)
- The Cave (2019)
- For Sama (2019)

== Video games ==
- Endgame: Syria (2012)
- 1000 Days of Syria (2014)
- Bury Me, My Love (2017)
- Syrian Warfare (2017)
- Holy Defence (2018)
- Call of Duty: Modern Warfare (2019)
