= 2010s in Syrian history =

The following events occurred during the 2010s in the political history of Syria.

== History of conflict (early to mid-2010s) ==
=== Syrian Civil War ===
The Syrian Civil War is an ongoing multi-sided civil war in Syria fought between the Ba'athist Syrian Arab Republic led by Syrian President Bashar al-Assad, along with domestic and foreign allies, and various domestic and foreign forces opposing both the Syrian government and each other in varying combinations. The war is currently the second deadliest of the 21st century.

The unrest in Syria, part of a wider wave of the 2011 Arab Spring protests, grew out of discontent with the Syrian government and escalated to an armed conflict after protests calling for Assad's removal were violently suppressed. The war, which began on 15 March 2011 with major unrest in Damascus and Aleppo, is being fought by several factions: the Syrian Armed Forces and its international allies, a loose alliance of mostly Sunni opposition rebel groups (including the Free Syrian Army), Salafi jihadist groups (including al-Nusra Front), the mixed Kurdish-Arab Syrian Democratic Forces (SDF), and the Islamic State of Iraq and the Levant (ISIL), with a number of countries in the region and beyond being either directly involved or providing support to one or another faction (Iran, Russia, Turkey, the United States, as well as others).

Iran, Russia, and Hezbollah support the Syrian Arab Republic and the Syrian Armed Forces militarily, with Russia conducting airstrikes and other military operations since September 2015. The U.S.-led international coalition, established in 2014 with the declared purpose of countering ISIL, has conducted airstrikes primarily against ISIL as well as some against government and pro-government targets. They have also deployed special forces and artillery units to engage ISIL on the ground. Since 2015, the U.S. has supported the Democratic Federation of Northern Syria and its armed wing, the SDF, materially, financially, and logistically. Turkey has been directly involved in operations against the Syrian government since August 2016, not only participating in airstrikes against ISIL alongside the U.S.-led coalition, but also actively supporting the Syrian opposition and occupying large swaths of northwestern Syria while engaging in significant ground combat with ISIL, the SDF, and the Syrian government. Between 2011 and 2017, fighting from the Syrian Civil War spilled over into Lebanon as opponents and supporters of the Syrian government traveled to Lebanon to fight and attack each other on Lebanese soil, with ISIL and Al-Nusra also engaging the Lebanese Army. Furthermore, while officially neutral, Israel has conducted airstrikes against Hezbollah and Iranian forces, whose presence in southwestern Syria it views as a threat.

International organizations have criticized virtually all sides involved, including the Ba'athist Syrian government, ISIL, opposition rebel groups, Russia, and the U.S.-led coalition of severe human rights violations and massacres. The conflict has caused a major refugee crisis. Over the course of the war, a number of peace initiatives have been launched, including the March 2017 Geneva peace talks on Syria led by the United Nations, but fighting continues.

== History of conflict (late 2010s to present) ==
=== Turkish offensive, 2019 ===
The 2019 Turkish offensive into north-eastern Syria, code-named by Turkey as Operation Peace Spring (Turkish: Barış Pınarı Harekâtı), is a cross-border military operation conducted by the Turkish Armed Forces (TAF) and the Syrian National Army (SNA) against the Syrian Democratic Forces (SDF) and later the Syrian Arab Army (SAA) in northeastern Syria.

On 6 October 2019, the Trump administration ordered American troops to withdraw from northeastern Syria, where the United States had been supporting its Kurdish allies. The military operation began on 9 October 2019 when the Turkish Air Force launched airstrikes on border towns. The conflict resulted in the displacement of over 300,000 people and has caused the death of more than 70 civilians in Syria and 20 civilians in Turkey. Human rights violations have also been reported. Amnesty International stated that it had gathered evidence of war crimes and other violations committed by Turkish and Turkey-backed Syrian forces who are said to "have displayed a shameful disregard for civilian life, carrying out serious violations and war crimes, including summary killings and unlawful attacks that have killed and injured civilians".

According to the Turkish President Recep Tayyip Erdoğan, the operation is intended to expel the SDF—viewed as a terrorist organization by Turkey due to its ties with the Kurdistan Workers Party (PKK), but considered an ally against ISIL by the United States and its allies—from the border region as well as to create a 30 km-deep (20 mi) "safe zone" in Northern Syria where some of the 3.6 million Syrian refugees in Turkey would resettle. As the proposed settlement zone is heavily Kurdish demographically, this intention has been criticized as an attempt to force drastic demographic change, a criticism denied by Turkey by saying that it only intended to "correct" the demographics that Turkish officials stated were changed by the SDF.

The Turkish operation received mixed responses by the international community. Including condemnations as well as support for the operation for the settlement of refugees in Northern Syria. While originally acknowledging Turkey's "right to defend itself", on 15 October, Russia hardened its position against the operation and deployed troops. Ten European nations and Canada imposed an arms embargo on Turkey, while the U.S. imposed sanctions on Turkish ministries and senior government officials in response to the offensive in Syria. Likewise, Trump's sudden pullout of US forces in Syria was also criticized by journalists as a "serious betrayal to the Kurds" as well as a "catastrophic blow to US credibility as an ally and Washington's standing on the world stage", one journalist stating that "this is one of the worst US foreign policy disasters since the Iraq War". On November 19, the Defense Department inspector general released a report finding that the American withdrawal and subsequent Turkish incursion allowed ISIL to "reconstitute capabilities and resources within Syria and strengthen its ability to plan attacks abroad".

The Syrian government initially criticized the Kurdish forces for the Turkish offensive, for their separatism and not reconciling with the government, while at the same time also condemning the foreign invasion in Syrian territory. However, a few days later, the SDF reached an agreement with the Syrian government, in which it would allow the Syrian Army to enter the SDF-held towns of Manbij and Kobanî in an attempt to defend the towns from the Turkish offensive. Shortly thereafter, Syrian state broadcaster SANA announced that Syrian Army troops had started to deploy to the country's north. Turkey and the SNA launched an offensive to capture Manbij on the same day.

On 17 October 2019, U.S. Vice President Mike Pence announced that the U.S. and Turkey agreed on a deal in which Turkey will agree to a ceasefire in Syria for 5 days in return for a complete withdrawal by the SDF from a safe zone south of the Syria-Turkey border. On 22 October 2019, Russian President Vladimir Putin and Turkish President Recep Tayyip Erdoğan reached a deal to extend the ceasefire by 150 additional hours for SDF to move 30 kilometers away from the border area as well as from Tal Rifaat and Manbij. The terms of the deal also included joint Russian–Turkish patrols 10 kilometers into Syria from the border except in the city of Qamishli. The new ceasefire started at 12pm local time on 23 October.

== Changes to conflict due to Turkish incursion of October 2019 ==
=== Changes in the local areas ===
In October 2019, in response to the Turkish offensive, Russia arranged for negotiations between the Syrian government in Damascus and the Kurdish-led forces. Mazloum Abdi, the Syrian Kurdish commander-in-chief, announced that they are ready to partner with Vladimir Putin (Russia) and Bashar al-Assad (Syria), stating that "We know that we would have to make painful compromises with Moscow and Bashar al-Assad if we go down the road of working with them. But if we have to choose between compromises and the genocide of our people, we will surely choose life for our people." The details of the agreement is unknown, but there are reports that suggest that the SDF will be incorporated into the Syrian Armed Forces and that northeastern Syria will come under direct rule of the Syrian government in Damascus. According to Syrian Kurdish officials, the deal allows Syrian government forces to take over security in some border areas, but their own administration would maintain control of local institutions.

The prospects for Kurdish autonomy in the region is severely diminished, because the Kurds were exposed to the Turkish-led offensive by the US withdrawal and the Russia-backed Syrian government forces under Assad—whose commonality is enmity towards Turkey and Sunni rebel militias—regained their foothold in northeast Syria after the Kurds had to seek their help. In regards to the United States and the situation, Mazloum Abdi stated that "We are disappointed and frustrated by the current crisis. Our people are under attack, and their safety is our paramount concern. Two questions remain: How can we best protect our people? And is the United States still our ally?" A deep sense of betrayal by their once American allies has come to be felt among the Syrian Kurdish populace.

As announced by Russia's Ministry of Defense on 15 October, Russian forces have started to patrol the region along the line of contact between Turkish and Syrian forces, indicating that Russia is filling the security vacuum from the sudden US withdrawal. Video footage shows Russian soldiers and journalists touring a base that the US left behind. Alexander Lavrentiev, Russia's special envoy on Syria, warned that the Turkish offensive into Syria is unacceptable and stated that Russia is seeking to prevent conflict between Turkish and Syrian troops.

In response to a speech by Assad, the Syrian Democratic Council said it was ready to have positive discussions with the Assad government. They said their focus would shift to stopping the Turkish invasion.

=== International reactions to Turkish incursion of October 2019 ===
Several US lawmakers have criticized the abandonment of their Kurdish allies, remarking that it undermines US credibility as an ally while benefiting Russia, Iran, and the Syrian regime of Assad. Meanwhile, several commentators in Moscow have stated that the situation is not in the immediate Russian interests, as the Turkish intervention in Syria clashes with Russia's backing of the Syrian government in the region, but it may provide opportunities for Russia as mediator as the US withdraws from Syria. Commentators have remarked that, since the US withdrawal, Russia has cemented its status as the key power broker in the Middle East.

Due to the situation in Syria, there are signs of a schism between Turkey and other NATO members, in which NATO is seen as effectively "powerless" to manage the situation and the Turkish government is aware that NATO does not hold much leverage. Furthermore, US President Trump, as well as US military and diplomatic officials, has cited the NATO membership of Turkey as a key reason that the United States can not be involved in the conflict between the Turkish and Syrian Kurdish forces. Meanwhile, due to Turkey's strategic position between Europe and the Middle East, the NATO alliance members are in a situation where they have limited themselves to relatively muted criticism.

Washington is reviewing the potential withdrawal of its nuclear weapons from Incirlik airbase under NATO's nuclear sharing as a result of the Turkish offensive per NYT. Republican senator Lindsey Graham and Democratic representative Eric Swalwell have called for possibly suspending Ankara's membership in NATO.

=== Agreement to Northern Buffer Zone ===
Russia and Turkey made an agreement via the Sochi Agreement of 2019 to set up a Second Northern Syria Buffer Zone. Syrian President Assad expressed full support for the deal, as various terms of the agreement also applied to the Syrian government.

The agreement reportedly included the following terms:

- A buffer zone would be established in Northern Syria. The zone would be around 30 kilometres (19 mi) deep, (Note: Starting from the Syrian-Turkish border and going south into Syria) stretching from Euphrates River to Tall Abyad and from Ras al-Ayn to the Iraq-Syria border, but excluding the town of Qamishli, the Kurds' de facto capital. (Note: See the "External links" section in the article Second Northern Syria Buffer Zone, for a link to an article containing an explanatory map of the buffer zone.)
- The buffer zone would be controlled jointly by the Syrian Army and Russian Military Police.
- All YPG forces, which constitute the majority of the SDF, must withdraw from the buffer zone entirely, along with their weapons, within 150 hours from the announcement of the deal. Their withdrawal would be overseen by Russian Military Police and the Syrian Border Guards, which would enter the zone at noon on 23 October.
- The YPG would also withdraw from the cities of Manbij and Tell Rifaat. (Note: Both of these cities are further to the south and not covered by the depth of the buffer zone, but are nonetheless explicitly mentioned in the agreement.)
- Following the YPG withdrawal, joint Russian-Turkish ground patrols would be held in the buffer zone area, but only within 10 kilometres (6.2 mi) from the border and not including Qamishli. (Note: No joint patrols will be held in the remaining part of the buffer zone.) (Note: Later, the Turkish President announced that the patrols would only be held to a depth of 7km, as opposed to 10. No reason was given for this change.)
- Ankara would retain sole control of the areas it had captured during its offensive between the towns of Tell Abyad and Ras al-Ayn.
- The Syrian Government would construct and man 15 border posts on the Turkish-Syrian border.
- The parties would launch a joint effort to resettle Syrian refugees in a "safe and voluntary manner".
- The parties would agree to "preserve the political unity and territorial integrity of Syria" as well as protect the "national security of Turkey".
- The parties would agree to reaffirm the importance of the Adana Agreement. Moscow will facilitate the implementation of the Adana Agreement.

=== Reactions ===
Various parties reacted to this new agreement, as follows.

- United Nations - On 1 November 2019 the UN Secretary-General met with President Erdogan of Turkey to discuss Turkey's proposal to relocate a large number of Syrian Refugees in Turkey to the Safe Zone. Mr. Guterres informed the Turkish President that the UNHCR will immediately form a team to study the proposal and engage in discussions with Turkish authorities, in line with its mandate. The Secretary-General greenlighted the proposal but told the Turkish President that the relocations should be "voluntary, safe and dignified".
- Syrian Democratic Forces - The SDF stated that they consider themselves as "Syrian and a part of Syria", adding that they will agree to work with Damascus. The SDF officially announced their support for the deal on October 27.
- Syria - Syrian President Bashar al-Assad thanked the Russian President for his role in the negotiation of the deal and expressed his full support for it. At the same time, he raised concerns about Turkish interference in Syrian affairs and dubbed Turkish President Erdogan a "thief".
- Turkey - Turkish President Recep Tayyip Erdoğan threatened to forcefully "clear terrorists" from the Syrian-Turkish border should the deal fail. He further reiterated his threat to let the Syrian refugees residing in Turkey at that point to freely emigrate into Europe, if Ankara does not receive "support" in its plan for the relocation of 1 to 2 million refugees within the buffer zone in what the Turkish President dubbed the "first stage" of their return.
- Iran - Iran's foreign ministry called the agreement "a positive step" and stated that it "backed any move to restore stability in the region".
- United States - US President Donald Trump praised the deal that he viewed as allowing "someone else [to] fight over this long bloodstained land", following which he ordered the lifting of the sanctions that he had placed on Turkey nine days prior as a reaction to the start of Turkey's offensive.
- Germany - German Chancellor Angela Merkel proposed that the buffer zone be enforced through an international force. Turkish Foreign Minister Mevlüt Çavuşoğlu rejected the plan, dubbing it "unrealistic".

== General operational developments, December 2019 to present ==
As of 12-11-2019 updated

As a result of the Turkish incursion, multiple Kurdish groups that were once rivals have begun to seek greater unity. Additionally, Syrian Kurdish officials have had some positive discussions with the Assad government, and with local countries such as Saudi Arabia, UAE and Jordan.

On the ground, Turkish areas of operations have been delineated by Russian mediators. Russian military officials forged agreements between Syria, Turkey and Kurds for areas to be patrolled by each side. Russia handles security through its own forces deployed in some key towns.

Damascus has forged agreements with some opposition groups to return to various local border areas. The Syrian Democratic Forces (SDF) reached agreement with the Assad regime for the Syrian Army to patrol several border areas. They also agreed on areas of deployment for Russian forces. The first agreement between SDF and the Assad regime occurred in October 2019, directly as a result of the Turkish incursion.

In general positive negotiations have increased between Syria and Turkey, and between Syria and Kurdish groups.

On December 9, Russian troops entered Raqqa and began distributing humanitarian aid.

Russia and Syria escalated their attacks against rebel forces in Idlib.

=== Refugees status ===
Numerous refugees remain in local refugee camps. Conditions there are reported to be severe, especially with winter approaching.

4,000 people are housed at the Washokani Camp. No organizations are assisting them other than the Kurdish Red Cross. Numerous camp residents have called for assistance from international groups.

Refugees in Northeast Syria report they have received no help from international aid organizations.

=== Syrian and Kurdish actions ===
Some reports stated that Bashar Assad was favorable towards Russia's efforts to restore calm and to stabilize the situation in Syria.

Meanwhile various Kurdish faction that were historical rivals began to meet in order to work together more. Their stated reason was to stand together against Russia and Turkey more strongly if needed. The Russian government has informed the Kurdish factions that they should reconcile and come up with a unified set of demands to clarify to Moscow. Various Kurdish factions blamed each other and their council for lack of progress.

Mustafa Bali, head of the Syrian Democratic Forces (SDF) said there were some agreements on the ground with the Syrian government, for Syrian forces to be deployed along the border.

The national Syrian government sent representatives to northeast Syria to meet with local groups there in order to address their concerns and to emphasize unity and combined effort to address problems. A meeting occurred in Qamishli city, in northeast Syria, that included Syrian national officials, and delegates from Kurdish, Arab, and Syrian figures and forces. Kurdish delegates emphasized their desire to help to protect Syria as a whole. They expressed willingness to have positive discussions with the Assad government.

Luqman Ehmê, spokesman for the North East Syria Autonomous Administration, said that his organization was ready for positive discussions with the Syrian regime.

SDF General Commander Mazlum Abdi has met with local leaders of the Wise Committee, which is composed of leaders of local communities and local family groupings. This meeting emphasized the importance on national unity, and the need to stand against Turkish invaders.

SDF Commander Mazlum Abdi called on the US and Russia to help stop Turkey from displacing entire communities and ethnic groups from the areas that it controls.

=== Turkish actions ===
Erdogan stated that Turkey was ready to resettle the Syrian refugees in the northern area that Turkey had invaded, and that Turkey would pay for it if necessary. On December 9, 2019, various local accounts indicated that Ankara was moving Syrian refugees into its zone of operations in Northern Syria for the first time. Erdogan said that Turkey was working to settle one million people in the cities of Tal Abyad and Ras Al-Ain in northern Syria. This has led to fears of population change

Russia said it would pledge to remove Turkish forces from a key highway in northern Syria, and replace them with Russian forces to maintain stability. Meanwhile, Turkey began to appoint local mayors and governors in several northern Syrian towns. They have also appointed about 4,000 police officers and other local officials, and are providing some basic local services for citizens.

It was reported that the Russian and Turkish armies had made a deal whereby electricity would be supplied to Tal Abyad by Russia's allies, the Kurdish-led Syrian Democratic Forces (SDF) who support Assad; while water would be supplied by the Alouk water station that is controlled by Turkish forces. This deal was mainly facilitated by Russian military officials.

It appeared that Turkey was withdrawing all of its forces away from the al-Shirkark silos, which hold important supplies of wheat, this seemed to be a result of Russian mediation. However, some reports said they later returned to re-occupy that area.

Russian and Turkish forces are continuing their joint patrols. Questions remained about how much control Turkey has over its proxies, such as the Free Syrian Army.

== Diplomatic developments, December 2019 to present ==
At a panel discussion on the conflict in December 2019, several experts said the conflict was slowly moving towards resolution. One expert said that the "Astana" diplomatic process, involving Turkey, Russia, and Iran, was having some positive results. Experts also said that Bashar Assad had made progress in restoring rule by local councils in areas affected by the conflict.

=== Diplomacy with NATO member nations ===
At the NATO summit in London in December 2019, President Emmanuel Macron of France highlighted major differences with Turkey over the definition of terrorism, and said there was little chance this aspect of the conflict could be resolved positively. Macron criticized Turkey strongly for fighting against groups who had been allied with France and the West in fighting terrorism.

Numerous issues in resolving the conflict emerged at the NATO summit in London. Ankara proposed a safe zone where Syrian refugees could be relocated, but this idea did not receive support from all parties. One professed "exclusive" press report claimed that prior to the NATO Summit, there was a meeting at 10 Downing Street of the leaders of France, the UK, Germany and Turkey. One key point that emerged that the Western countries insisted that refugees could only be relocated voluntarily. Meanwhile, there were concerns in NATO about Turkey's growing closeness with Russia.

Erdogan claimed that a four-way summit on Syria was scheduled to occur in Turkey in February 2020, to include Ankara, Berlin, London and Paris.

=== Diplomacy with nations outside NATO ===
At a meeting in Damascus, Russian and Syrian officials clearly stated their support for Syria regaining control over all of its territory. The United Arab Emirates also expressed official support for Assad.

A new round of meetings for the Astana summit process took place in the Kazakh capital Nur Sultan. The meeting includes Russia, Syria, Turkey and Iran. At this meeting Moscow, stated that the "safe zone" established by Turkey should not be expanded, as this would not accomplish anything positive for the region.

The Astana process was created by Turkey, Iran and Russia in order to find a lasting solution to the conflict. they have examined a process to reform the constitution of Syria via the newly-formed Syrian Constitutional Committee. The parties reported that they reached some important understandings at this meeting, including affirming a commitment to work together to respect Syrian territorial integrity.

== Syrian Constitutional Committee ==
On November 20, 2019, a new Syrian Constitutional Committee began operating in order to discuss a new settlement and to draft a new constitution for Syria. This committee comprises about 150 members. It includes representatives of the Syrian regime, opposition groups, and countries serving as guarantors of the process such as e.g. Russia. However, this committee has faced strong opposition from the Assad regime. 50 of the committee members represent the regime, and 50 members represent the opposition. The committee began its work in November 2019 in Geneva, under UN auspices. However, the Assad regime delegation left on the second day of the process.

At a summit in October 2018, envoys from Russia, Turkey, France and Germany issued a joint statement affirming the need to respect territorial integrity of Syria as a whole. This forms one basis for their role as "guarantor nations."

The second round of talks occurred around November 25, but was not successful due to opposition from the Assad regime. At the Astana Process meeting in December 2019, a UN official stated that in order for the third round of talks to proceed, co-chairs from the Assad regime and the opposition need to agree on an agenda.

The committee has two co-chairs, Ahmad Kuzbari representing the Assad regime, and Hadi Albahra from the opposition. It is unclear if the third round of talks will proceed on a firm schedule, until the Assad regime provides its assent to participate.

== See also ==
- NATO
- Arab League
