= Qena University =

Public university in Qena, Egypt

Qena University جامعة قنا
- Faculty of Agriculture, Qena University
- Former name: South Valley University
- Type: Public
- Established: 1958; 68 years ago
- President: Prof. Dr. Ahmed Akkawy Abdulaziz
- Administrative staff: 1786
- Undergraduates: 55872
- Postgraduates: 6042
- Location: Qena, Qena Governorate, Egypt
- Campus: Qena, Hurghada
- Website: www.svu.edu.eg/en/

Qena University (QU) is a university in Egypt that provides teaching and research facilities. Initially a branch of Assiut University, QU was established in 1995. The university has a second campus in the coastal city of Hurghada, just south of where the Gulf of Suez meets the Red Sea. Its former campus in the city of Sohag became the separate Sohag University in 2006.

Qena University has 16 faculties split between the two campuses. Hurghada is home to the Faculty of Education. Other faculties include Arts, Law, Science, Special Education, Medicine, Veterinary Medicine, Nursing, Engineering, Commerce, Agriculture and Physical Education. The President of the University is Prof. Dr. Ahmed Akkawy Abdulaziz.

== Technical affairs ==
The University’s technical affairs has the three components: Education and Students, Postgraduate Studies and Research, Community Service and Environmental Development.

=== Postgraduate studies ===
The sector is concerned with all fields related to postgraduate studies (Diploma – Masters – Doctorate – Fellowship), also the scientific research and anything related to it, such as output, topics, journals, academic promotions, training and motivation for researchers, devices and laboratories. The sector also includes university libraries, whether central or those in colleges, university hospitals and museums, borrowing systems, etc.

=== Community services and environmental development ===
The sector supervises the centers and units of special nature and also the university establishments that provide services for the community and the surrounding environment. In addition to that the sector organizes symposiums and conferences, which aim to raise the level of the environmental culture. In addition to that the service convoys (medical, veterinary, awareness campaign…) for the direct interaction with the surrounding community.

== See also ==
- Education in Egypt
- List of universities in Egypt
