= Saleh, Beni Suef =

Bani Saleh
- Location within Egypt
- Country: Egypt
- Province: Beni Suef

Population (2006)
  - Total: 10,171
- Time zone: UTC+2 (EET)
  - Summer (DST): UTC+3 (EEST)

The village of Bani Saleh is one of the villages located in the center Fashn Beni Suef Arab Republic of Egypt. In 2006, it had a population of 10,171.

== See also ==
- Beni Suef
- List of villages in Beni Suef Governorate
