= List of villages in Beni Suef Governorate =

List of villages in Beni Suef Governorate

The village	The Centre	Total population	Males	Females
Abshna, Beni Moussa, Beni Suef	Beni Suef	16273	8443	7830
Alhakamnh, Beni Suef	Beni Suef	8958	4710	4248
Alhalabet, Beni Suef	Beni Suef	6101	2003	3099
Aldwalth, Beni Suef	Beni Suef	5608	2851	2757
Drugs, Beni Suef	Beni Suef	6783	3433	3350
KOM Al-Ahmar, Beni Suef	Beni Suef	10946	1937	7072
Green ihnasiya village in Beni Suef	Beni Suef	13009	6718	1926
Aho, Beni Suef	Beni Suef	12183	6164	6031
Barot, Beni Suef	Beni Suef	19137	9735	9402
Old Baja, Beni Suef	Beni Suef	The following 15401	8013	7457
Blvia, Beni Suef	Beni Suef	22034	43086	11106
Bani Bakhit, Beni Suef	Beni Suef	6819	3491	3328
Bani Hamad, Beni Suef	Beni Suef	2885	1478	1407
Bani, Bani sweif radouane	Beni Suef	3150	1587	1563
Solomon built East Beni Suef	Beni Suef	5122	2600	2522
Brown affan, Beni Suef	Beni Suef	8425	4328	4100
Beni Haroun in Beni Suef	Beni Suef	9961	4834	
White Arabs, Beni Suef	Beni Suef	14,147	7312	6824
East Beni Suef tzmant	Beni Suef	11829	5842	8126
Tzmant, Beni Suef	Beni Suef	2285	2169	
Solomon built a Turnpike, Beni Suef	Beni Suef	8,164	7057	6049
Dmoshia, Beni Suef	Beni Suef	12,406	5614	5197
Riyadh, Beni Suef	Beni Suef	5280	2748	2532
Puss, Beni Suef	Beni Suef	7631	3649	
Smith, Beni Suef	Beni Suef	14190	7073	6599
Facility, Beni Suef HADR	Beni Suef	2191	1105	1086
Al Asim, Beni Suef	Beni Suef	8772	4522	4250
Menkrish, Beni Suef	Beni Suef	4015	2025	1990
Nazlat Abu Salim, Beni Suef	Beni Suef	5386	2700	2686
Cold alsaadenh, Beni Suef	Beni Suef	4066	2078	1988
Battles cold, Beni Suef	Beni Suef	2553	1260	1293
Naim, Beni Suef	Beni Suef	8940	4626	4306
Carpets, Beni Suef	Beni Suef	3517	1647	1870
Tel abounarouz, Beni Suef	Beni Suef	2523	1281	1242
Absog, Beni Suef	El fashn	10818	5331	5160
Akvhs, Beni Suef	El fashn	14038.	7140	7040
Wire, Beni Suef	El fashn	5000	2564	2436
Algvadon, Beni Suef	El fashn	1,033	6681	27592
Algmhod, Beni Suef	El fashn	8062	4073rd	3989
And dear, Beni Suef	El fashn	16209	8205	8004
Green corner, Beni Suef	El fashn	3485	1781	1704
Blond, Beni Suef	El fashn	6,004	3033	3031
Elephant, Beni Suef	El fashn	21503	43350	10750
Elephant, Beni Suef	El fashn	9,452	4676	4668
Alkodabi, Beni Suef	El fashn	4624	2364	2260
Qlaiaa, Beni Suef	El fashn	4914	2442	2472
Church, Beni Suef	El fashn	3581	1891	1690
Besva, Beni Suef	El fashn	2640	1344	1296
Bani, Bani suwayf	El fashn	10039	5249	4922
Brown Menen, Beni Suef	El fashn	6750	3493	3247
Followed, Beni Suef	El fashn	12208	12511	
Aloklet Island, Beni Suef	El fashn	4173	2115	2058
Delhans, Beni Suef	El fashn	9184	4742	4442
Shanri, Beni Suef	El fashn	21177	10557	10620
Saleh, Beni Suef	El fashn	4429	2174	2255
SAFT alkharsa, Beni Suef	El fashn	7197	3455	3210
SAFT Ta'if by Muhammad, Bani suwayf	El fashn	1988	4679	4212
SAFT, Beni Suef	El fashn	7400	3830	3570
Evaporation, Beni Suef	El fashn	9744	4964	4831
Manor followed, Beni Suef	El fashn	4311	2127	2184
Hamlet Darwish, Beni Suef	El fashn	6124	3052	3072
Hamlet apart, Beni Suef	El fashn	3024	1505	1519
AMR, Beni Suef plant	El fashn	9583	4758	4825
[The [Sadat, Beni Suef plant]]	El fashn	5601	2835	2766
Cold akvhs, Beni Suef	El fashn	9191	4644	4547
Cold wire, Beni Suef	El fashn	6141	2983	3158
Cold Hanna, Beni Suef	El fashn	4451	2231	2220
Father make molq, Beni Suef	Wasta	19532	9875	9693
Aboit, Beni Suef	Wasta	12004	6317	5687
Atawab, Beni Suef	Wasta	11192	9871	
Avoh, Beni Suef	Wasta	| 6212	5732	
Houmt, Beni Suef	Wasta	7590	3939	3651
Diabiah, Beni Suef	Wasta	7183	3721	3418
Crucified, Beni Suef	Wasta	5549	2884	2649
Auspicious, Beni Suef	Wasta	25026	13113	11913
Norms, BNS	Wasta	3633	1862	1771
Pyramid, Beni Suef	Wasta	4670	3966	
Anfst, Beni Suef	Wasta	8816	4600	4208
Brown hader, Beni Suef	Wasta	9775	5096	4679
Solomon built, Beni Suef	Wasta	10287	5330	4967
Bani Ghanim, Beni Suef	Wasta	5802	3033	29639
Bani Muhammad, Bani suwayf	Wasta	973	516	457
Brown backer, Beni Suef	Wasta	4014	2131	1883
Island assistance, Beni Suef	Wasta	| 7,845	7347	
Island light, Beni Suef	Wasta	4065	2174	1891
Corner of crucified, Beni Suef	Wasta	16524	8530	7983
East Beni Suef SAFT	Wasta	11870	5833	
SAFT, Beni Suef	Wasta	5628	2896	2732
Detour avoh, Beni Suef	Wasta	8809	4654	4262
They bride, Beni Suef	Wasta	28246	14553	13693
Kfar abegig, Beni Suef	Wasta	3563	1814	1749
Hamlet built Osman, BNS	Wasta	5789	2992	2797
COM Abu Radi, Beni Suef	Wasta	3293	2861	
COM adrigh, Beni Suef	Wasta	7809	4167	3642
Winepress father made, Beni Suef	Wasta	6967	3700	3268
A father made, Beni Suef	Wasta	123	5139	4922
Johnsonville, Beni Suef	Wasta	| 7971	7833	
Nazlat Al-Junaidi, Beni Suef	Wasta	1984	1011	973
Luna pastor, Beni Suef	Wasta	13036	6958	6306
Adraset, Beni Suef	Ihnasiya village	1596	842	754
Albhsmon, Beni Suef	Ihnasiya village	10464	5344	5120
Shoubak, Beni Suef	Ihnasiya village	2811	1417	1394
Alawaonh, Beni Suef	Ihnasiya village	10785	5482	5303
Almosaed white, Beni Suef	Ihnasiya village	4624	4276	
.J, Beni Suef	Ihnasiya village	| 0147	8175	
Barawa, Beni Suef	Ihnasiya village	4733	2360	2373
Bani Hani, Beni Suef	Ihnasiya village	5960	3042	2918
Bhenmoh, Beni Suef	Ihnasiya village	1637	828	809
Der barawa, Beni Suef	Ihnasiya village	5238	2650	2588
Sdmant mountain, Beni Suef	Ihnasiya village	13119	6525	18501
Gluttonous, Beni Suef	Ihnasiya village	4210	2123	2087
Surged miles inland on the Beni Suef	Ihnasiya village	6,914	6148	5260
Quai, Beni Suef	Ihnasiya village	16011	8167	7844
Little, Beni Suef	Ihnasiya village	4806	2442	2364
Olha, Beni Suef	Ihnasiya village	4,074	3200	3356
Kafr Abu Shahba, Beni Suef	Ihnasiya village	4983	2511	2472
COM marine sand, Beni Suef	Ihnasiya village	2917	1503	1414
Sleepy mill, Beni Suef	Ihnasiya village	4533	2304	2229
A princes, Beni Suef	Ihnasiya village	10270	5248	5022
Al Badini, Beni Suef plant	Ihnasiya village	4983	2451	2532
Al Haj, Beni Suef	Ihnasiya village	8060	4085	3975
Immaculate facility, Beni Suef	Ihnasiya village	5333	2716	2617
Al-Samad, Beni Suef	Ihnasiya village	6257	3158	3141
Created as SAP, Beni Suef	Ihnasiya village	6504	3193	3311
Mnherh, Beni Suef	Ihnasiya village	7317	3714	3603
Menhro, Beni Suef	Ihnasiya village	7765	4505	3971
Manial ghidan, Beni Suef	Ihnasiya village	2877	1390	1487
Manial Hani, Beni Suef	Ihnasiya village	3025	1563	1495
Miana, Beni Suef	Ihnasiya village	13,032	7141	7004
Cold Orientals, Beni Suef	Ihnasiya village	3560	1895	1665
Catarrh, Beni Suef	Ihnasiya village	3384	1758	1626
Catarrh behind, Beni Suef	Ihnasiya village	4355	2174	2181
Cold Shawish, Beni Suef	Ihnasiya village	19,850	4536	4301
Us webhnna, Beni Suef	Ihnasiya village	11448	5758	5861
Abu artery, Beni Suef	BPA	7569	3768	3801
Albranka, Beni Suef	BPA	9867	4803	5058
Young, Beni Suef	BPA	2004	971	1033
East Beni Suef Island	BPA	3149	1616	1533
Royal, Beni Suef	BPA	3657	1781	1876
Aldabaanh, Beni Suef	BPA	4792	2360	2432
Bubble, Beni Suef	BPA	6641	3418	3223
Navigational, Beni Suef	BPA	5141	2509	
Marine salt, Beni Suef	BPA	2969	1497	1472
Or tracks, Beni Suef	BPA	4457	2222	2235
Martyr Hassan, Beni Suef	BPA	6578.	3535	3449
Bani Ahmed, Bani suwayf	BPA	5123	2535	2588
Bani, Bani suwayf	BPA	608	312	296
Bani, Bani suwayf	BPA	3208	1647	1561
Bani, Bani suwayf	BPA	1481	666	815
Bani, Bani suwayf	BPA	9740	4484	4205
Brown Mady, Beni Suef	BPA	5625	2739	2886
Bani Muhammad, Bani suwayf	BPA	1282	640	642
Bani, Bani suwayf	BPA	4456	2205	2251
Bani Hashim, Beni Suef	BPA	2929	1468	1461
Mount light, Beni Suef	BPA	2073	1040	1033
Bubble Island, Beni Suef	BPA	2410	1218	1192
Island of BIBA, Beni Suef	BPA	3182	1657	1525
Living Orientals, Beni Suef	BPA	4027	1989	2039
Corner of nano, Beni Suef	BPA	10298	5226	5072
One-sixth of the mirrors, Beni Suef	BPA	15916	8205	7711
SAFT rasheen, Beni Suef	BPA	21,403	10886	10517
Spokesman lbishah, Beni Suef	BPA	5640	2904	2773
Tarshob, Beni Suef	BPA	6002	3014	2988
Tansa built Malo, Beni Suef	BPA	10025	4990	5035
Harddrive, Beni Suef	BPA	6872	3479	3,393
East Beni Suef Rochelle	BPA	4140	2078	2062
Rochelle West, Beni Suef	BPA	7601	3746	3855
Zara, Beni Suef	BPA	3464	1730	1734
Kenbsh red, Beni Suef	BPA	13,659	4,453	6964
Hamlet Juma, Beni Suef	BPA	4271	2135	2136
Kafr Mansour, Beni Suef	BPA	6164	3096	3056
Hamlet, Beni Suef	BPA	8786	4638	4148
Facility Abu dukhan, Beni Suef	BPA	1436	761	674
MNet, Beni Suef	BPA	3436	1765	1671
Manial, Beni Suef	BPA	4772	2511	2261
Cold corner, the Beni Suef	BPA	5865	2962	2903
Nazlat Al-Sharif, Beni Suef	BPA	7134	3588	3546
Cold to kilani, Beni Suef	BPA	1625	1550	
Hrbshant, Beni Suef	BPA	7565	3881	3684
Halet, Beni Suef	BPA	11906	6167	5739
Alshantor, Beni Suef	Smsta	| 7352	7472	
Al-' asakra, Beni Suef	Smsta	8401	4244	4100
Casbah, Beni Suef	Smsta	3014	1443	1571
Mahmudiya, Beni Suef	Smsta	2942	1446	1496
Bedhl, Beni Suef	Smsta	5,662	4575	4538
Brown suit, Beni Suef	Smsta	11439	5778	5661
Bani Mohammed Rashid, Beni Suef	Smsta	2718	1319	1399
Soueif, Beni Suef	Smsta	11844	6057	37728
Dshtot, Beni Suef	Smsta	20009	9775	45201
Serbo-Croatian, Beni Suef	Smsta	2128	2218	
Manor alshantor, Beni Suef	Smsta	6089	3035	
Manor caftan, Beni Suef	Smsta	5393	2763	2630
Abed in Kafr El-Sheikh, Beni Suef	Smsta	2288	1100	1188
Kafr Bani, Bani suwayf	Smsta	3045	1526	1519
Sandy tribal com, Beni Suef	Smsta	2035	2144	
COM, Beni Suef	Smsta	3709	1782	1927
False, Beni Suef	Smsta	31995	16,383	5327
Facility Abu malih, Beni Suef	Smsta	5217	2589	2628
Solomon, Beni Suef plant	Smsta	2803	1389	1414
Nazlet El-DEEB, Beni Suef	Smsta	2447	1292	1155
Cold Saeed, monufia	Smsta	5061	2561	2500
Ashmont, Beni Suef	Nasser	23893	12491	11402
Tower, Beni Suef	Nasser	4436	2241	2195
Critical, Beni Suef	Nasser	4020	2093	1927
Bath, Beni Suef	Nasser	7205	3784	3421
Riyadh, Beni Suef	Nasser	| 6733	6104	
Olive, Beni Suef	Nasser	13808	6929	6500
Mansoura, Beni Suef	Nasser	2089	1110	979
Bani, Bani suwayf	Nasser	2384	1259	1125
Bani, Bani suwayf	Nasser	15593	7678	6763
Bhishin, Beni Suef	Nasser	25747	13253	12273
Abu Saleh, Beni Suef	Nasser	5362	2774	2588
Dolls, Beni Suef	Nasser	14142	7215	6578.
Dendel, Beni Suef	Nasser	11203	6410	5406
Bush spokesman, Beni Suef	Nasser	13213	6812	6410
Tansa molq, Beni Suef	Nasser	10875	5280	4982
Samuel ghit, Beni Suef	Nasser	1791	219	879
Hamlet, Beni Suef	Nasser	6945	3406	3539
COM Abu khallad, Beni Suef	Nasser	12234	6419	5815
Facility company, Beni Suef	Nasser	3025	1546	1479
A twab, Beni Suef	Nasser	1955	1025	930

== See also ==
- Beni Suef
