= Planned community =

Settlement built according to a plan

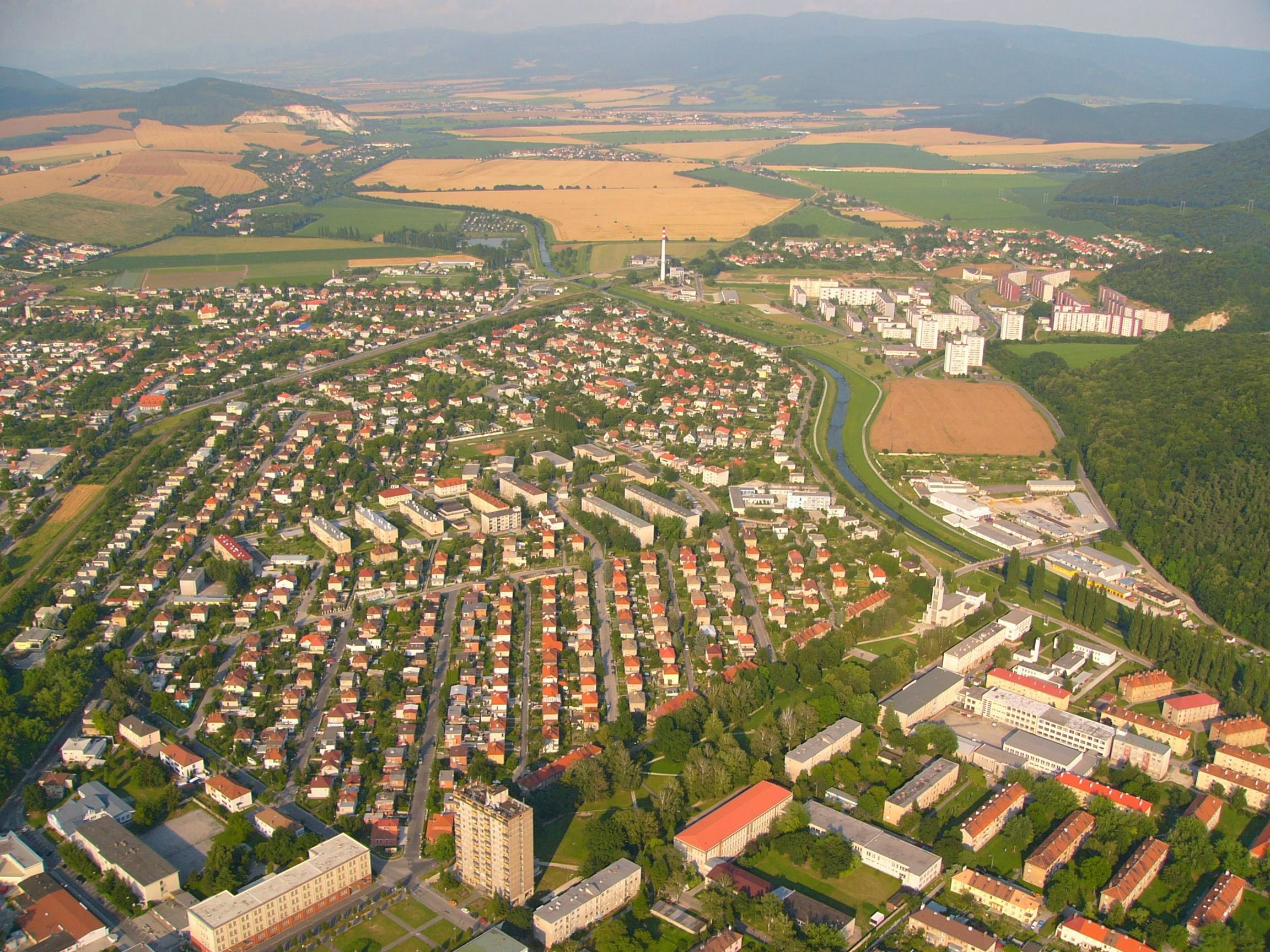
Partizánske/Baťovany in Slovakia – an example of a typical planned industrial city founded in 1938 together with a shoemaking factory at which practically all adult inhabitants of the city were employed

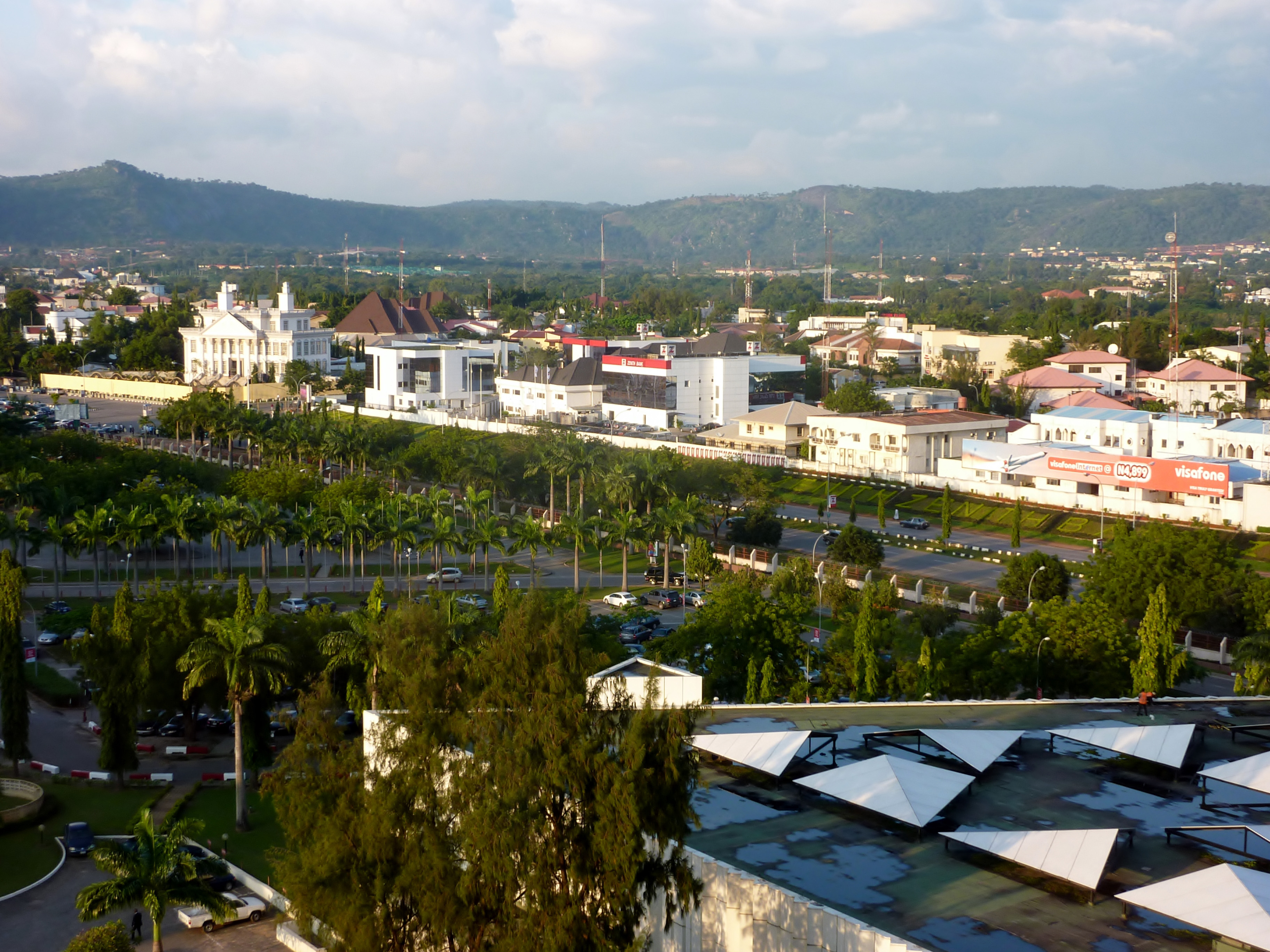
Abuja, the capital of Nigeria, which was built mainly in the 1980s, was the fastest growing city in the world between 2000 and 2010, with an increase of 139.7%, and is still expanding rapidly.

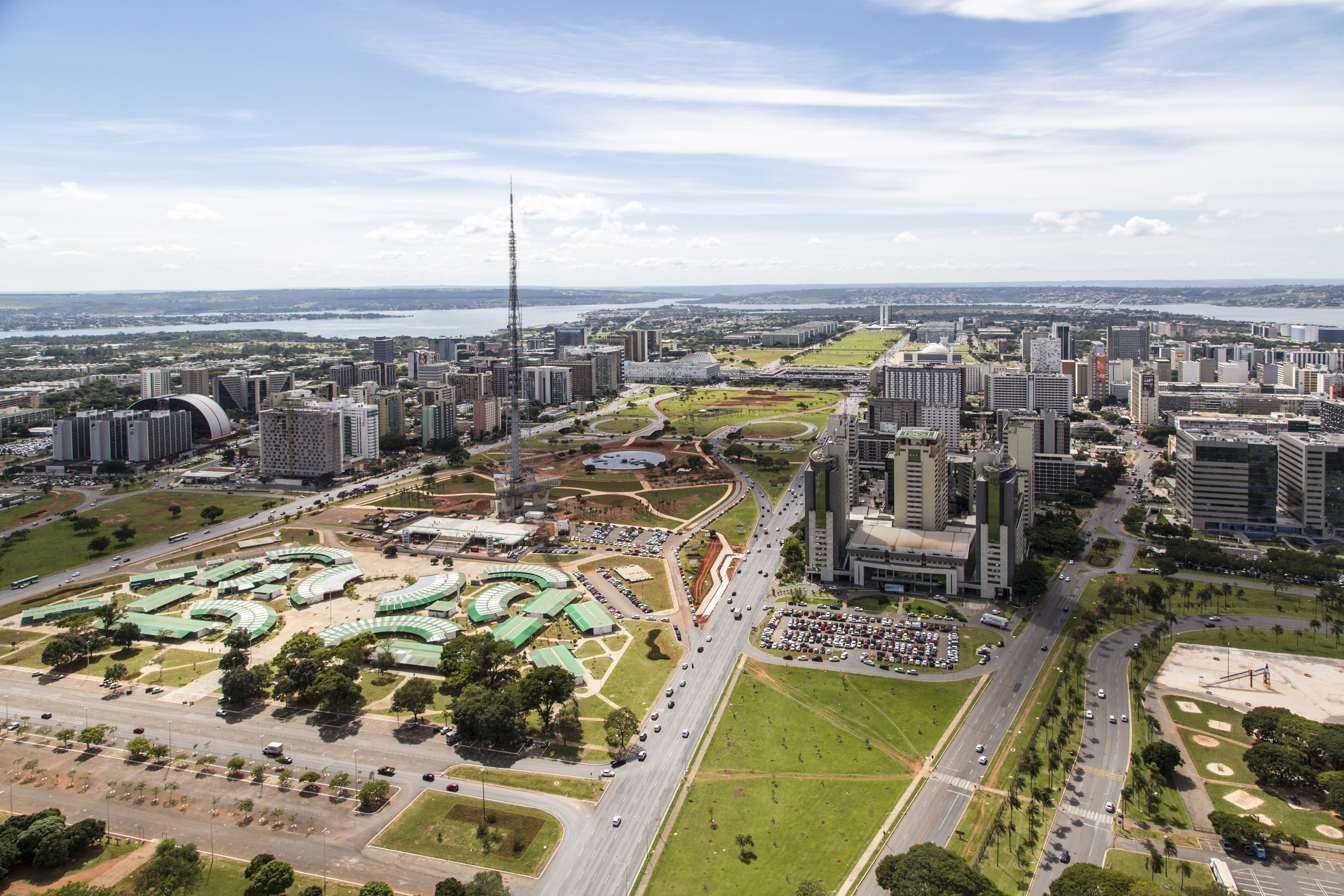
Brasília, the capital of Brazil, was built in less than 3 years in the 1960s.

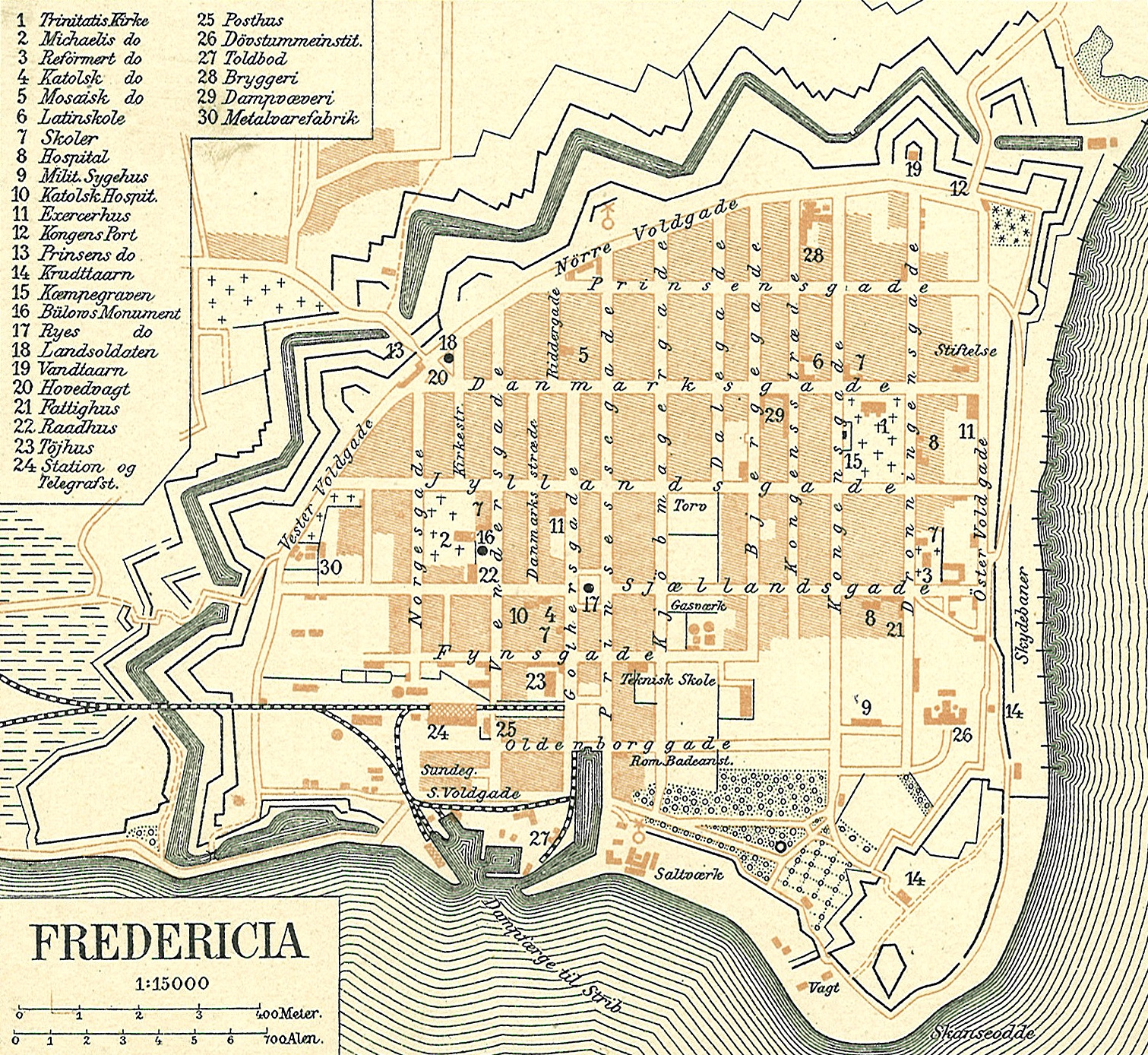
Plan of Fredericia (Denmark) in 1900 – the city was founded in 1650.

A planned community, planned city, planned town, or planned settlement is any community that was carefully planned from its inception and is typically constructed on previously undeveloped land. This contrasts with settlements that evolve organically.

The term new town refers to planned communities of the new towns movement in particular, mainly in the United Kingdom. It was also common during the European colonization of the Americas to build according to a plan either on fresh ground or on the ruins of earlier Native American villages.

A model city is a type of planned city designed to a high standard and intended as a model for others to imitate. The term was first used in 1854.

== Planned capitals ==
Washington, D.C. was built as a planned city.

A planned capital is a city specially planned, designed and built to be a capital. Several of the world's national capitals are planned capitals, including Canberra in Australia, Brasília in Brazil, Belmopan in Belize, New Delhi in India, Abuja in Nigeria, Islamabad in Pakistan, Naypyidaw in Myanmar (Burma), Washington, D.C. in the United States, the modern parts of Astana in Kazakhstan, and Ankara in Turkey. In Indonesia, Nusantara was planned to be inaugurated on 17 August 2024, and in Egypt a new capital city (to the east of Cairo) is under construction. Putrajaya, the federal administrative and judicial centre of Malaysia, is also a planned city.

Abu Dhabi (UAE) and some of the recently built cities in the Persian Gulf region are also planned cities.

Sejong was constructed to be a planned-administrative capital of South Korea.

== Africa ==
=== Botswana ===
The city of Gaborone was planned and constructed in the 1960s.

=== Egypt ===
Company towns

During the construction of the Suez Canal in the 1860s, and after, new towns were planned and built to serve the new international shipping canal. Other smaller company towns were built during the 20th Century to serve oil exploration sites and factories. The larger towns have since been incorporated into mainstream local government.

- Port Fuad – Port Said Governorate.
- Port Tewfik – Suez Governorate
- Ismailia – Ismailia Governorate
- Ras Ghareb – Red Sea
- Mosta'maret al-Mahallah – Gahrbia
- Kima – Aswan
- Sahary – Aswan
- Mosta'maret al-Sad – Aswan

New urban communities

In the late 1970s, it became national policy to construct new desert towns in Egypt, managed by the New Urban Communities Authority.

- 6th of October (city) – Giza Governorate.
- 10th of Ramadan (city) – Sharqia Governorate.
- 15th of May (city) – Cairo Governorate.
- Badr – Cairo Governorate.
- New Borg El Arab – Alexandria Governorate.
- El Shorouk – Cairo Governorate.
- New Akhmim – Sohag Governorate.
- New Aswan – Aswan Governorate.
- New Asyut – Asyut Governorate.
- New Beni Suef – Beni Suef Governorate.
- New Cairo – Cairo Governorate.
- New Damietta – Damietta Governorate.
- New Fayum – Fayum Governorate.
- New Nubariya – Beheira Governorate.
- New Qena – Qena Governorate.
- New Salhia – Sharqia Governorate.
- New Tiba – Luxor Governorate.
- Obour (city) – Qalubyia Governorate.
- Sheikh Zayed City – Giza Governorate.

==== NUCs under construction ====
- New Administrative Capital – Cairo
- New Alamein – Matrouh
- New Ismailia – Ismailia
- El Galala – Suez (not part of NUCA)

==== Pre-modern ====
- Memphis, Egypt – The first capital of Egypt. It was built by the king Narmer around 3150 B.C.
- Akhetaten – A city which was built by the King Akhenaten in the 14th century B.C. It was the capital of Egypt in his reign.
- Pithom – A city was built by the King Ramesses II in the 13th century B.C.
- Pi-Ramesses – Another city which was built by Ramesses II in the 13th century B.C. It was the capital of Egypt in his reign and it was the first city to exceed 100,000 in history. At its peak, the population of the city was 300,000.
- Heracleion – A city built in the 7th Century B.C. The city had been a major port in Ancient before it sank.
- Alexandria – A city built by Alexander the Great in the 4th century B.C. It was the first city to have a population of half million.
- Ptolemais Hermiou – A city built by Ptolemy I in the 4th century B.C.
- Berenice Troglodytica – A city built by Ptolemy I in the 3rd century B.C. on the Red Sea Coast.
- Fustat – A city built by 'Amr ibn al-'As when he conquered Egypt to be its capital around the 7th century A.C.
- al-Askar – The capital of Egypt during the Tulunide Dynasty.
- al-Qata'i – Capital of Egypt during the Ikhshid Dynasty.
- Cairo – It was built in the 10th century A.D. by the Fatimid Caliph Al Muizz.

=== Equatorial Guinea ===
In 2012, President Teodoro Obiang decided to move the capital to a new jungle site at Oyala.

=== Kenya ===
Konza Technology City is a planned city that is hoped to become a hub of African science and technology upon its completion in 2030.

Tatu City is also another planned city located in Kiambu county.

=== Nigeria ===
The capital, Abuja, is a planned city and was built mainly in the 1980s. Several other cities are under development to accommodate the rapidly growing population, some of which include: Eko Atlantic City, a planned city of Lagos State being constructed on land reclaimed from the Atlantic Ocean. Upon completion, the new city which is still under development, is anticipating 250,000 residents and a daily flow of 150,000 commuters. Centenary City, in the Federal Capital Territory, is another planned smart city under development. The city is designed to become a major tourist attraction to the country. A list of Nigerian cities and neighbourhoods that went through a form of planning are as follows:

- Abuja, one of the most populous planned cities, and the fastest growing city in the world.
- Banana Island, an affluent neighbourhood in Ikoyi, Lagos, Lagos State
- Bonny Island in Rivers State
- Centenary City in the Federal Capital Territory
- Eko Atlantic in Lagos State
- Festac Town in Lagos, Lagos State
  - FESTAC Phase 2, the next phase for Festac has been proposed.
- Ikeja, the capital of Lagos State
- Lekki, a new city in Lagos State
  - Lekki Free Zone, a free trade zone in the Lekki
  - Orange Island, a planned real estate development in Lekki.
- Victoria Island in Lagos, Lagos State

=== Senegal ===
- Akon City, the nation's first planned city, co-planned by the Senegalese-American singer Akon.

=== South Africa ===
A number of cities were set up during the apartheid-era for a variety of ethnic groups. Planned settlements set up for white inhabitants included Welkom, Sasolburg and Secunda. Additionally the majority of settlements in South Africa were planned in their early stages and the original town centres still lie in a grid street fashion. Some settlements were also set up for non-whites such as the former homeland capital of Bisho.

== Asia ==
=== Azerbaijan ===
- Sumqayit was planned as an industrial city to support the Soviet Union's petrochemical industry. It became one of Azerbaijan's major industrial centers, housing factories and workers' residential areas.
- Mingachevir was established in the 1940s as a planned city to serve as the center for Azerbaijan's hydroelectric power production, hosting the Mingachevir Hydroelectric Power Station, one of the largest in the country.
- Ganja (city) underwent urban planning during the Soviet period, with the development of modern infrastructure including residential and commercial districts, along with the expansion of industrial facilities to support the growing population.
- Shirvan was developed as an industrial city, with a focus on chemical and agricultural industries. The city's growth was part of the Soviet-era initiative to establish more industrial hubs in Azerbaijan.
- Gabala, once a small town, is undergoing urbanization with modern infrastructure projects aimed at transforming it into a major tourist and cultural center while still preserving its natural surroundings.
- Khirdalan, located near Baku, was developed as a satellite city to ease the population pressure in the capital. The city has seen significant growth with new residential areas and local amenities.

=== Hong Kong ===
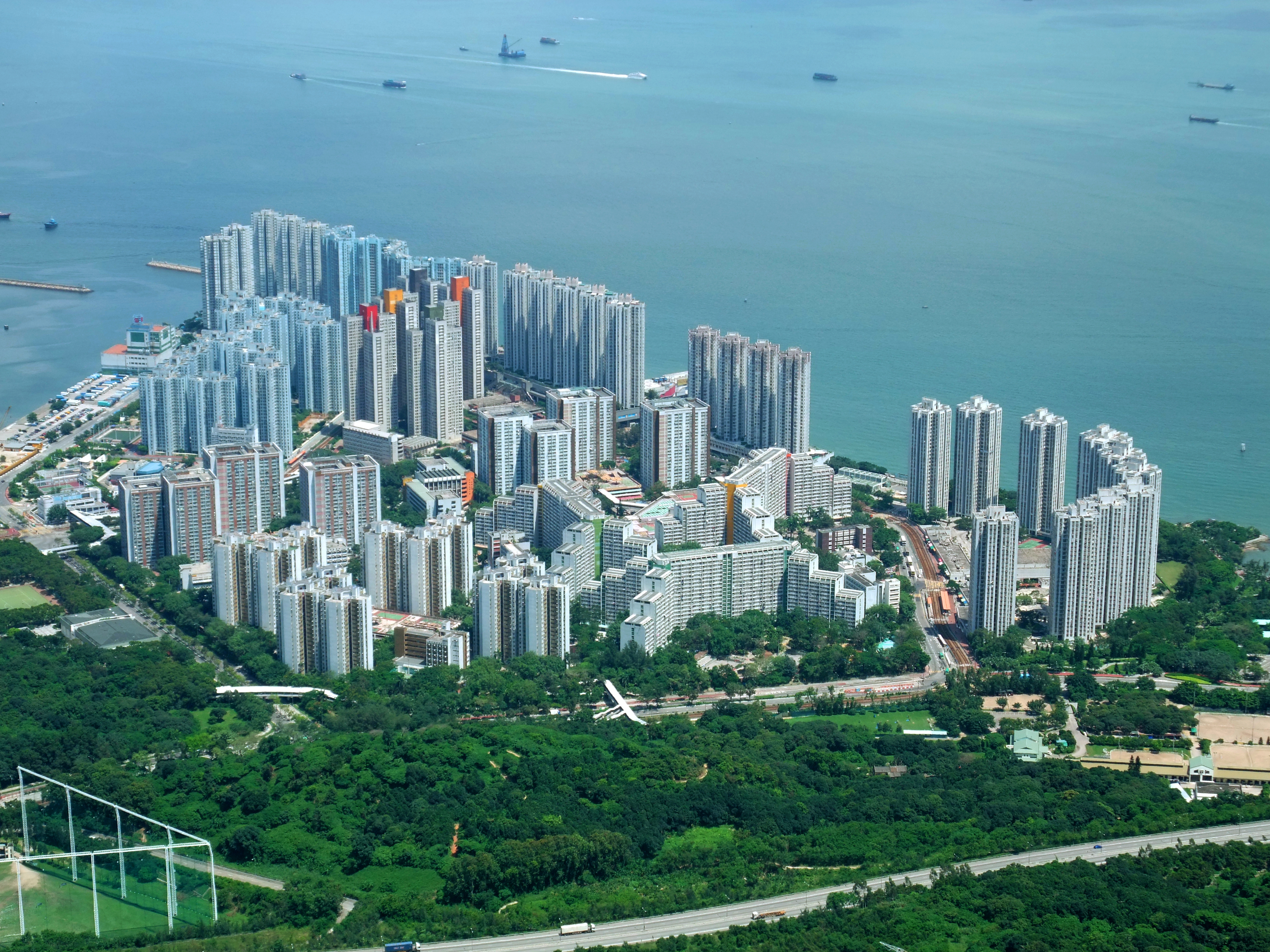
Southern Castle Peak, Part of Tuen Mun New Town, developed from the 1970s onward

The terrains of Hong Kong are mostly mountainous and many places in the New Territories have limited access to roads. Hong Kong started developing new towns in the 1950s, to accommodate rapidly growing populations. In the early days the term "satellite towns" was used. The very first new towns included Tsuen Wan and Kwun Tong. Wah Fu Estate was built in a remote corner on Hong Kong Island, with similar concepts in a smaller scale.

In the late 1960s and the 1970s, another stage of new town developments was launched. Nine new towns have been developed to date. Land use is carefully planned and development provides plenty of room for public housing projects. Rail transport is usually available at a later stage. The first towns are Sha Tin, Tsuen Wan, Tuen Mun and Tseung Kwan O. Tuen Mun was intended to be self-reliant, but was not successful at the beginning and maintained as a dormitory town up until the recent decades like the other new towns. More recent developments are Tin Shui Wai and North Lantau. The government also plans to build such towns in Hung Shui Kiu, Ping Che-Ta Kwu Ling, Fanling North and Kwu Tung North. At present, there are a total of nine new towns:

- Tsuen Wan New Town
- Sha Tin New Town
- Tuen Mun New Town
- Tai Po New Town
- Fanling-Sheung Shui New Town
- Yuen Long New Town
- Tseung Kwan O New Town
- Tin Shui Wai New Town
- North Lantau New Town

=== Indonesia ===
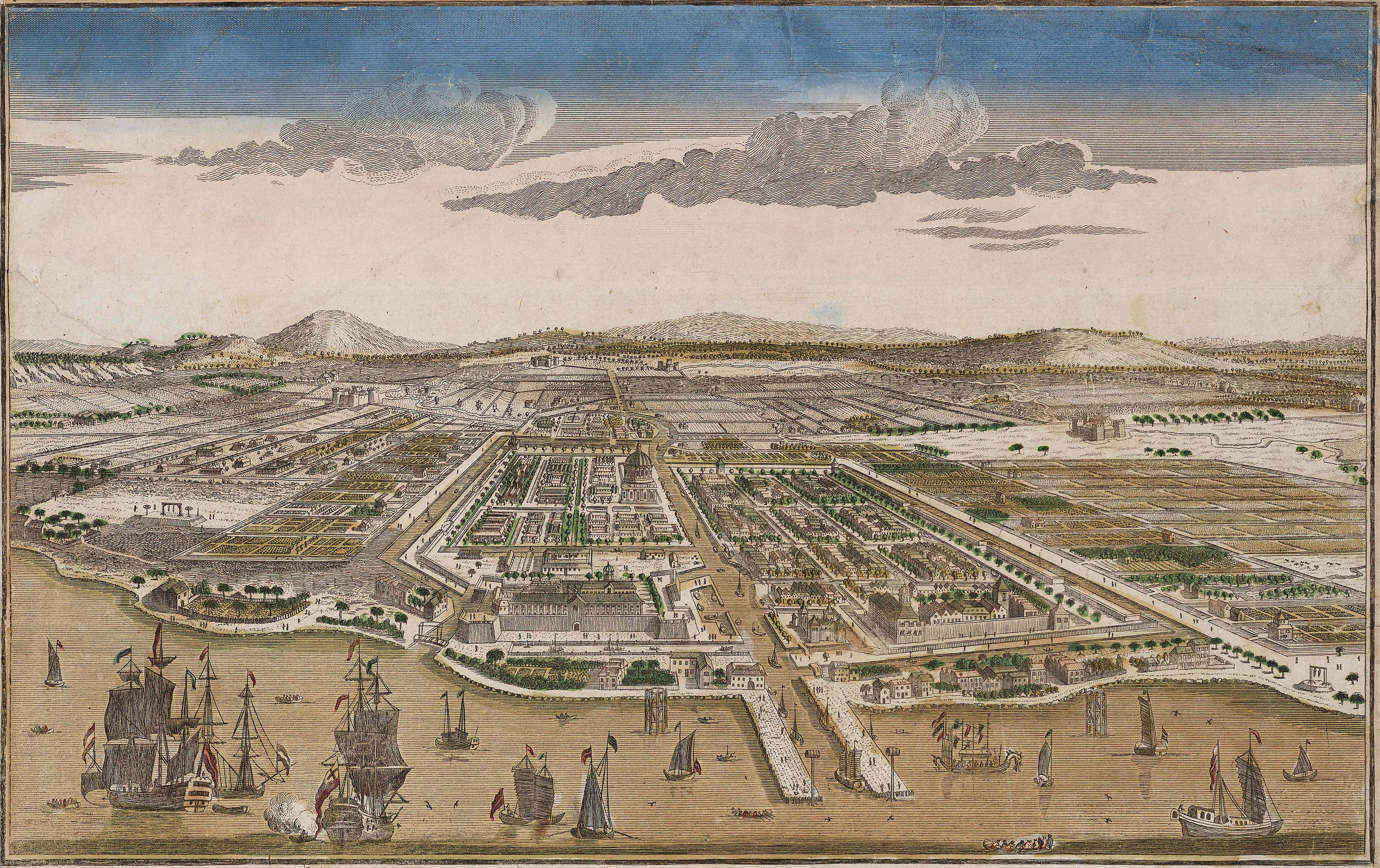
Batavia, c. 1780

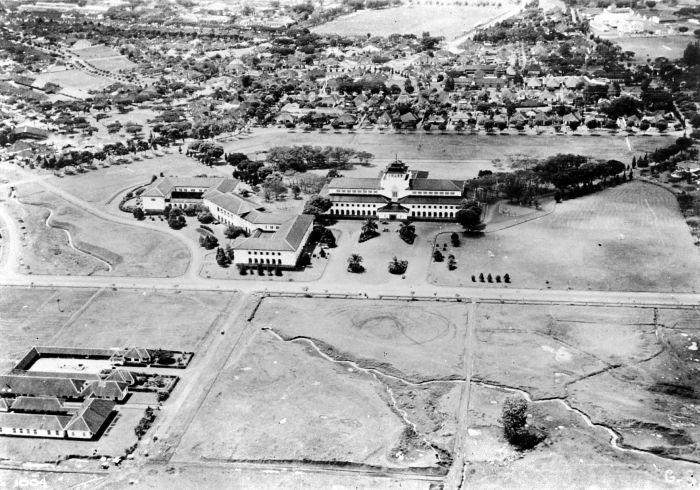
Bandung laid as a well-planned city, set as the new capital of the Dutch East Indies back in the 1920s.

- Jakarta
  - Batavia (predecessor of modern Jakarta) was a planned city, modeled after Dutch 17th century coastal city architecture. First, in the 17th century as a planned fortified city, crisscrossed with Dutch-style canals dug in regular grid. The city served as the administrative center of Dutch East India Company.
  - In the early 19th century, the Dutch colonial authority moved their administrative center from the dilapidated and unhealthy port town of Old Batavia (now Kota area) several kilometres south to Weltevreden area (now Central Jakarta). Old Batavia and Weltevreden were connected by the Molenvliet Canal and a road (now Gajah Mada Road) that ran alongside the waterway. It was a well-planned community around the Koningsplein, the Waterlooplein and Rijswijk (Jalan Veteran). The area, then known as Weltevreden, which include the Koningsplein, Rijswijk, Noordwijk, Tanah Abang, Kebon Sirih, and Prapatan became a popular residential, entertainment and commercial district for the European colonial elite.
  - Menteng, today a sub-district in Central Jakarta, was first built as a well-planned community. An urban design developed in the 1910s set the area to become a residential area for Dutch people and high officials. At the time of its development, the area was the first planned garden suburb in colonial Batavia. Supported by easy access to service centers and nearby to the central business district, this area has become one of the most expensive areas for residential real estate in modern Jakarta.
- In the early 20th century, Bandung was planned by the Dutch East Indies government as a new capital city to replace Batavia. The idea was to separate the busy trading port or the commercial center (Batavia) from the new administrative and political center (Bandung). By the 1920s the plan to transfer the capital to Bandung was underway. As the city began to laid the master plan of a well-planned new city, grid of streets and avenues were laid, and numbers of government buildings were constructed, such as Gedung Sate that was planned as the colonial administrative center of Dutch East Indies. The plan, however, failed due to the Great Depression and the outbreak of the Second World War.
- Since Palangkaraya was established as the capital of Central Kalimantan province in 1957, the first president of Indonesia, Sukarno, outlined a plan to develop Palangkaraya as the future capital of Indonesia. Palangkaraya is far larger in area than Jakarta and safe from the danger of earthquakes and volcanoes, common on the island of Java.
- In the late 1950s to the first half of the 1960s, Sukarno, Indonesia's first president, laid a master plan to build Jakarta as the planned national capital of the Republic of Indonesia. He filled Jakarta with numbers of monuments and statues. Numbers of monumental projects were conceived, planned and initiated during his administration, including Monumen Nasional, Istiqlal mosque, DPR/MPR Building, and Gelora Bung Karno stadium. Sukarno also filled Jakarta with nationalistic monuments and statues, including Selamat Datang Monument, Pemuda Monument at Senayan, Dirgantara Monument at Pancoran, and Irian Jaya Liberation Monument at Lapangan Banteng. Although many of this projects were completed later in his successor era (Suharto administration), Sukarno is credited for shaping Jakarta's monuments and landmarks. He desired Jakarta to be the beacon of a powerful new nation.
- Because of Jakarta's environmental degradation and overpopulation problems, there has been an idea to build a new proposed capital city to replace Jakarta. In 2019, President Joko Widodo announced that Indonesia will move its capital from Jakarta to the new planned city in the East Kalimantan province which will be built in between the regencies of Penajam North Paser and Kutai Kartanegara. Its construction will commence in 2020. The new national capital will be called Nusantara and it is set to be inaugurated in 2024 with the groundbreaking ceremony in March 2022. The capital is expected to form a new province separated from East Kalimantan, similar to Jakarta.

=== Iran ===
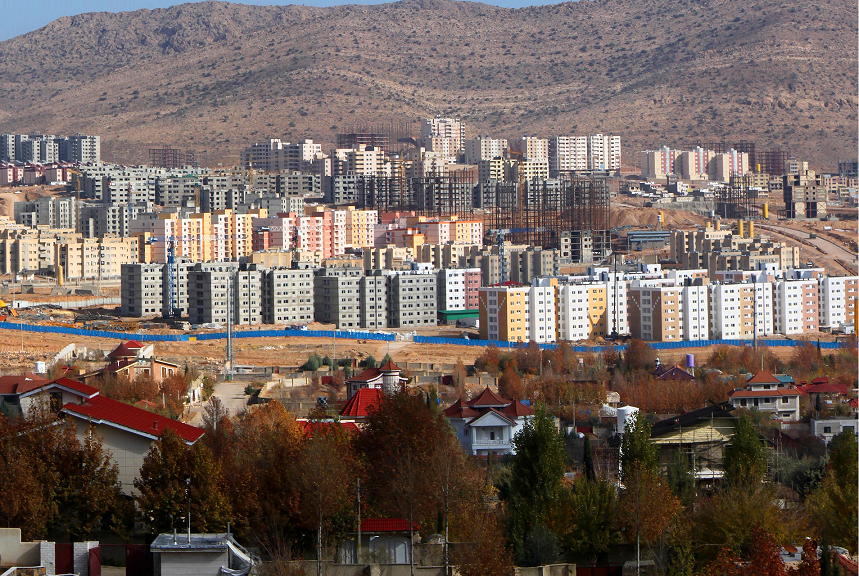
Sadra, a planned city near Shiraz

In the period of the Persian Safavid Empire, Isfahan, the Persian capital, was built according to a planned scheme, consisting of a long boulevard and planned housing and green areas around it.

In modern-day Iran more than 20 planned cities have been developed or are under construction, mostly around Iran's main metropolitan areas such as Tehran, Isfahan, Shiraz and Tabriz. Some of these new cities are built for special purposes such as:

- Pardis, which is built as a scientific city.
- Poulad-Shahr, which is an industrial city built for the housing of Isfahan's steel industry workers.
- Shirin Shahr which is to provide housing for the sugar industry personnel.
- Tehranpars which was built to house Tehran's additional population.
- Shahrak-e Gharb, built as a massive project of modern apartment buildings.
- Parand which is intended to provide residences for the staff of Imam Khomeini International Airport.
- Shushtar New Town which was built to provide housing for the employees of a sugar cane processing plant.

576,000 people were planned to be settled in Iran's new towns by 2005.

For a list of Iran's modern planned cities see: List of Iran's planned cities.

=== Israel ===
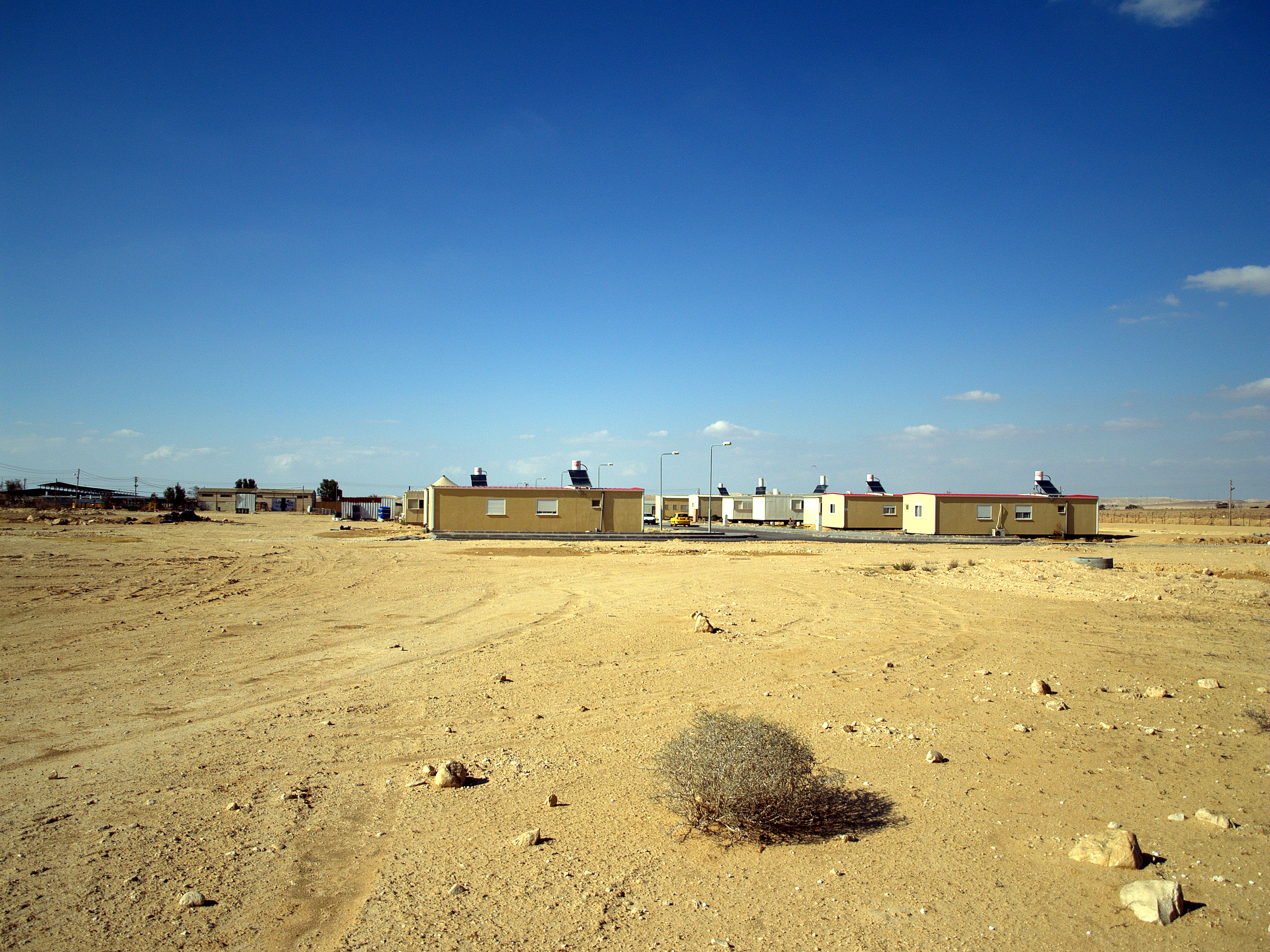
A planned community in the Negev

According to politics of country settlement a number of planned cities were created in peripheral regions. De facto all the cities which have Jewish population its new Jewish side have been planned like New Acre and Nazareth Illit. Those cities also known as Development Towns. The most successful is Ashdod with more than 200,000 inhabitants, a port and developed infrastructure. Other cities that were developed following Israel's lineation plan are Shoham, Karmiel and Arad. Modi'in-Maccabim-Re'ut has been another of the country's most successful planned cities. Construction began in 1994 and it now has a population of over 80,000. Modi'in also rates higher in terms of average salary and graduation rates than the national average. It was designed and planned by Israeli architect Moshe Safdie. Many Israeli settlements follow this model, including towns like Modi'in Illit and Betar Illit.

=== Japan ===
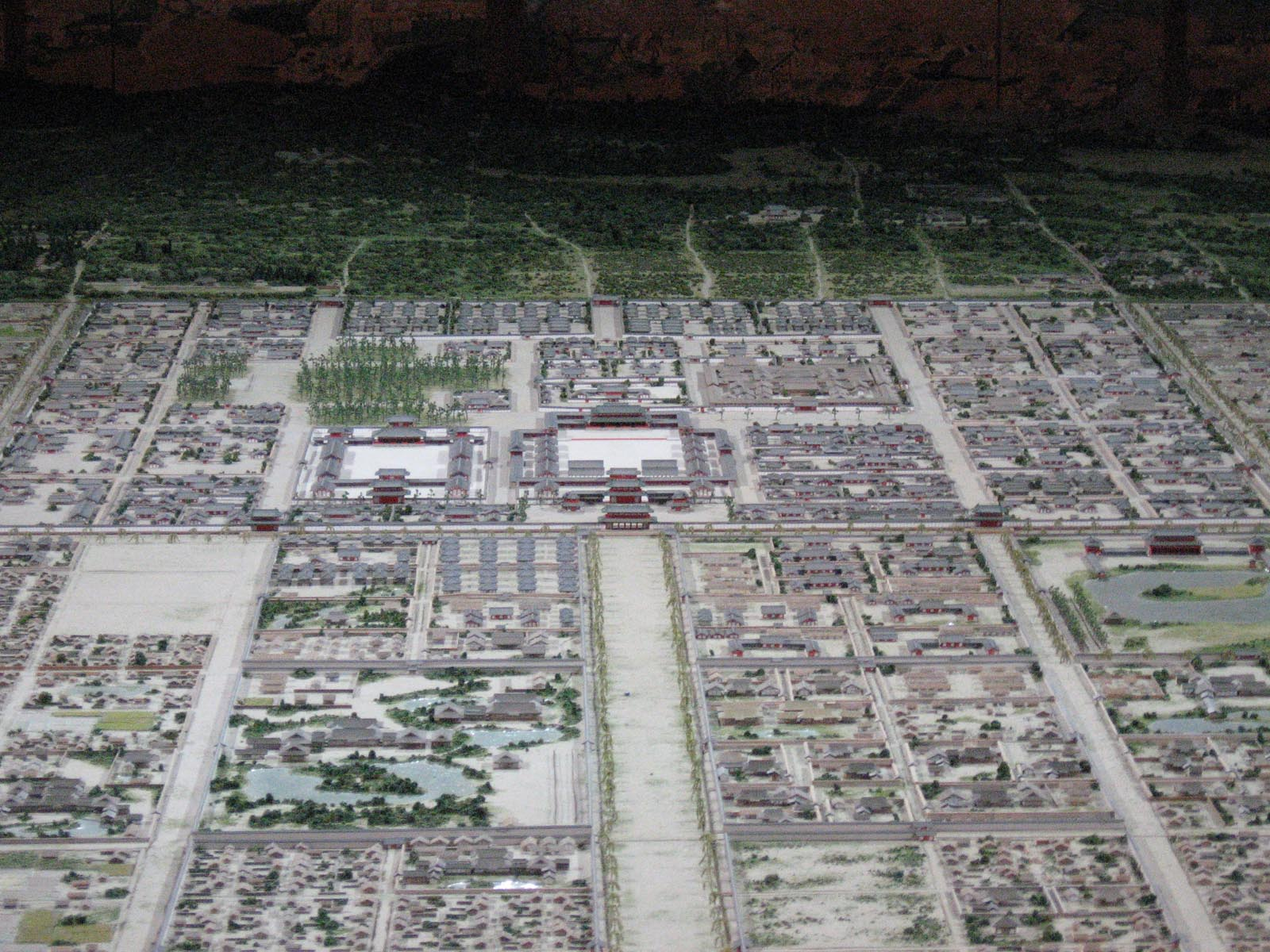
Kyoto was built on a grid system, starting in 794.

The city of Kyoto was developed as a planned city in 794 as a new imperial capital (then called Heian-kyō), built on a grid layout and remained the capital for over a millennium. The grid layout remains, reflected in major east–west streets being numbered, such as 4th street (四条, shi-jō). In modern times, Sapporo was built from 1868, following an American grid plan, and is today the fifth-largest city in Japan. Both these cities have regular addressing systems (following the grid) unlike the usual subdivision-based Japanese addressing system.

Borrowing from the New Town movement in the United Kingdom, some 30 new towns have been built all over Japan. Most of these constructions were initiated during the period of rapid economic growth in the 1960s, but construction continued into the 1980s. Most of them are located near Tokyo and the big cities in Kansai region. Some towns, (Senri New Town, Tama New Town) do not provide much employment, and many of the residents commute to the nearby cities. These towns fostered the infamous congestion of commuter trains (although as the metropolitan areas have grown, this commute has become relatively short in comparison to commutes from the new urban fringe).

Other New Towns act as industrial/academic agglomerations (sangyo-shuseki) (Tsukuba Science City, Kashima Port Town). These areas attempt to create an all-inclusive environment for daily living, in accordance with Uzō Nishiyama's "life-spheres" principle.

Japan has also developed the concept of new towns to what Manuel Castells and Sir Peter Hall call technopolis. The technopolis program of the 1980s has precedents in the New Industrial Cities Act of the 1960s. These cities are largely modeled after Tsukuba Academic New Town (Tsukuba Science City) in that they attempt to agglomerate high-tech resources together in a campus-like environment.

In the past, the Japanese government had proposed relocating the capital to a planned city, but this plan was cancelled.

Overall, Japan's New Town program consists of many diverse projects, most of which focus on a primary function, but also aspire to create an all-inclusive urban environment. Japan's New Town program is heavily informed by the Anglo-American Garden City tradition, American neighborhood design, as well as Soviet strategies of industrial development.

In 2002 Prime Minister Junichiro Koizumi announced the end of new town construction, although the new towns continue to receive government funding and redevelopment.

Sources:

- Ministry of Construction, Japan International Cooperation Agency, City Bureau. 1975? City Planning in Japan.
- Hein, Carola. 2003. "Visionary Plans and Planners: Japanese Traditions and Western Influences" in Japanese Capitals in Historical
- Perspective, Nicholas Fiévé and Paul Waley, eds. New York: RoutledgeCurzon, 309–43.
- Scott, W. Stephen. 2006. Just Housing? Evidence of Garden City Principles in a Postwar Japanese New Town. Undergraduate diss. New College of Florida.

=== Kazakhstan ===
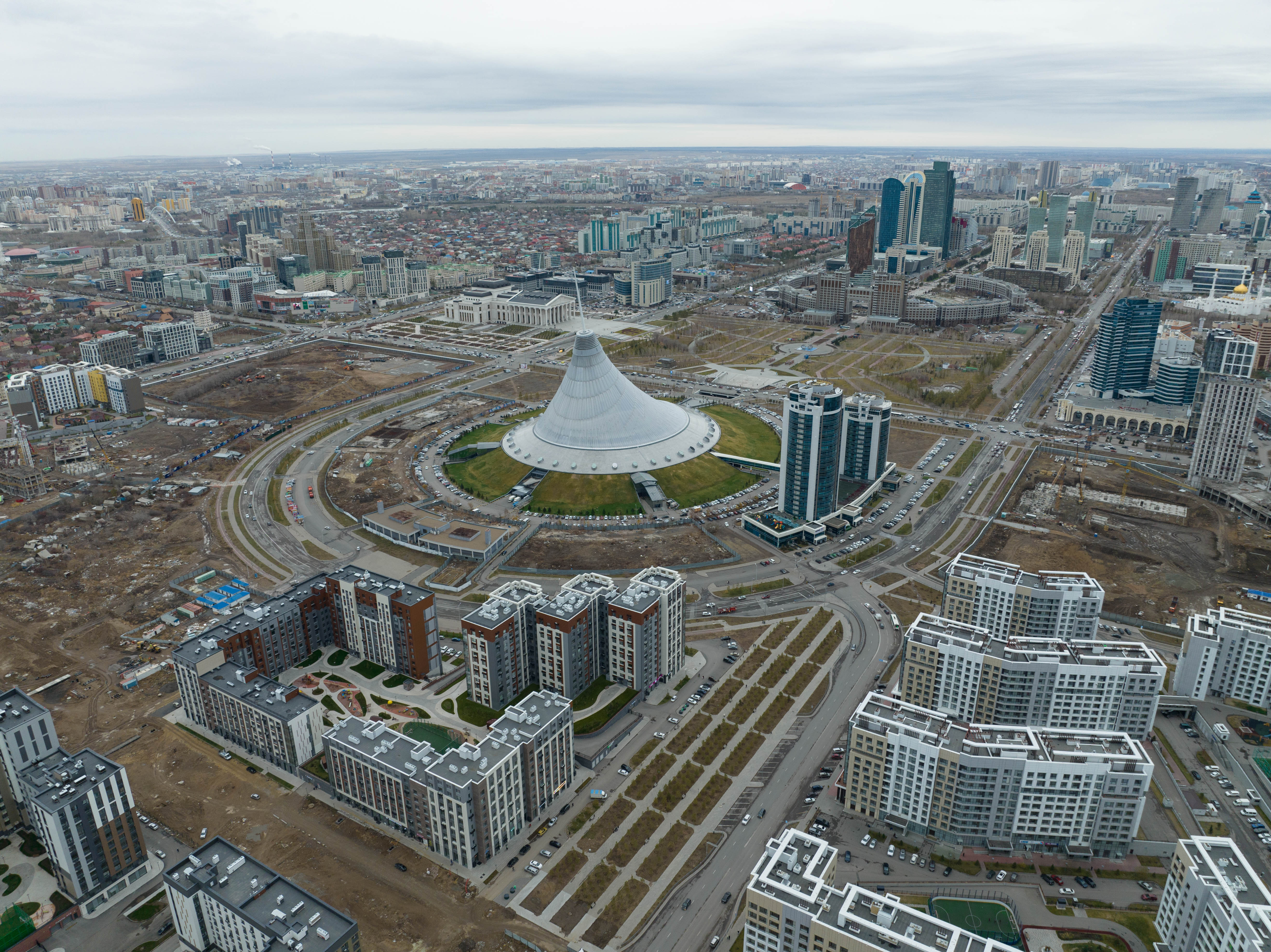
Astana, the capital of Kazakhstan

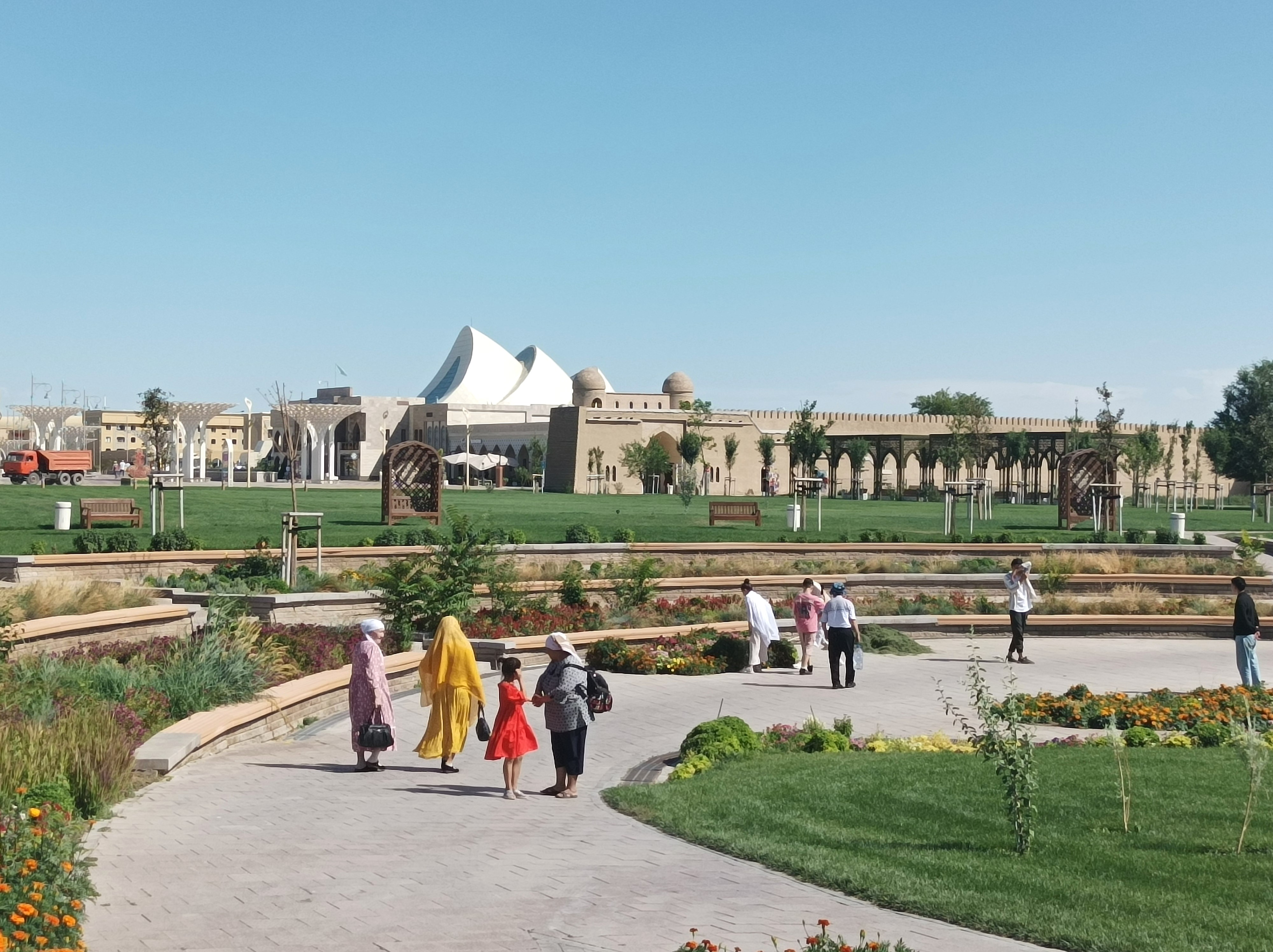
Turkistan

Kazakhstan has several planned cities, many of which were founded in recent history as part of the country's shift from its historically nomadic pastoralism to a more urbanized and industrialized society. This transition began particularly during the Soviet era, as the country developed its infrastructure and urban areas to support industrial growth and modernization.

Some of the most prominent planned cities in Kazakhstan reflect this shift, with their establishment linked to the growth of key industries such as energy, mining, and manufacturing:

- Astana was originally founded as Akmolinsk and was restructured to become the planned capital city of Kazakhstan in 1997. Its modern planning by Japanese architect Kisho Kurokawa reflects the shift towards urbanization and industrialization, focusing on government institutions, modern infrastructure, and green spaces.
- Turkistan has recently started undergoing significant urbanization and development. Historically a center for cultural and religious importance, the city now enjoys special city status, with efforts to preserve its historical appearance through the establishment of a reserve of archaeological monuments, while new infrastructure is being built in a traditional design style.
- Ekibastuz was planned during the Soviet era to support coal mining and energy production, serving as an industrial city built for the region's resource needs.
- Zhanaozen was developed as a key hub for Kazakhstan's oil and gas industry, designed to support workers in this vital sector.
- Temirtau was a planned industrial city created in the 20th century to support Kazakhstan's steel production industry.
- Aktau was built as a planned center to support the growing oil industry, positioned along the Caspian Sea as a hub for Kazakhstan's energy sector.
- Karaganda was initially developed as a mining town, later becoming a planned city with infrastructure to support coal mining and steel production.
- Shymkent though it has ancient roots, the modern development of Shymkent reflects Kazakhstan's post-Soviet urbanization, with the city growing around trade, industry, and administrative functions.
- Pavlodar was developed as an industrial hub focused on chemical and energy industries.
- Atyrau was transformed from a fishing village into a planned city, primarily due to its proximity to Kazakhstan's key oil and gas reserves.
- Kyzylorda was developed in response to the need for irrigation and agriculture in southern Kazakhstan.
- Saran was a small industrial city developed during the Soviet era to support Kazakhstan's steel industry, particularly as a satellite city of larger industrial centers like Karaganda.
- Aksu was created as a planned industrial town to support the development of aluminum production.
- Kokshetau was a small town that evolved into a regional center, planned with a focus on agriculture and light industry.
- Baikonur was established as the Soviet Union's primary space launch facility and remains a key planned city in Kazakhstan, designed to support space exploration and technology.

=== Malaysia ===
- Kuala Kubu Bharu
- Bandar Baru Bangi
- Shah Alam
- Putrajaya, Malaysia's new administrative capital
- Cyberjaya
- Petaling Jaya (New Town)
- Kulim Hi-Tech Park
- Iskandar Puteri
- Iskandar Malaysia

=== Myanmar ===
Naypyidaw is the capital of Myanmar. It is administered by the Naypyidaw Union Territory, as per the 2008 Constitution. On 6 November 2005, the administrative capital of Myanmar was officially moved to a greenfield 3.2 km west of Pyinmana, and approximately 300 km north of Yangon (Rangoon), the previous capital. The capital's official name was announced on 27 March 2006, coinciding with Myanmar's Armed Forces Day. Much of the city was still under construction as late as 2012. As of 2009, the population was 925,000, which makes it Myanmar's third largest city, after Yangon and Mandalay.

=== Pakistan ===
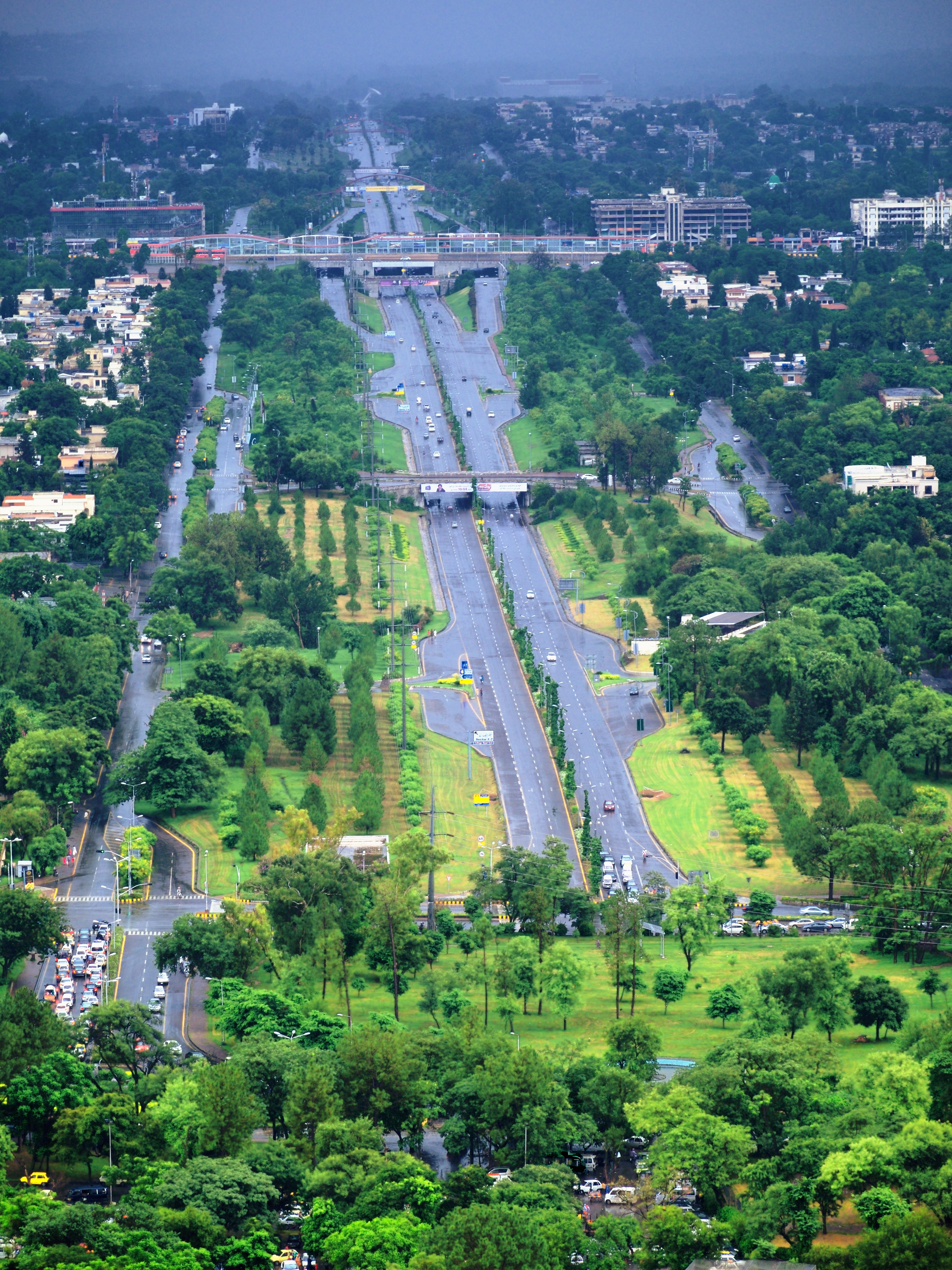
Islamabad, Pakistan

- Islamabad, planned capital city whose foundations were laid during the 1950s
- Ravi City, riverfront and urban development megaproject (expected population 25–35 million, under construction since December 2020)
- Gwadar, port city established as the southern leg for China–Pakistan Economic Corridor
- Faisalabad, established by the British and later Ayub Khan as a planned industrial city
- Jauharabad, a planned town situated in Khushab District, Punjab, Pakistan
- Sargodha, established by the British for air defence
- Sahiwal
- Bahria Town, privately built towns in Islamabad–Rawalpindi, Lahore and Karachi
- Defence Housing Authority, Islamabad
- Defence Housing Authority, Lahore
- Defence Housing Authority, Karachi
- Clifton, Karachi
- WAPDA Town
- DHA City
- LDA City

=== Palestine ===
- Rawabi

=== Mainland China ===
Many ancient cities in China, especially those on the North China Plain, were carefully designed according to the fengshui theory, featuring square or rectangular city walls, rectilinear road grid, and symmetrical layout. Famous examples are Chang'an in Tang dynasty and Beijing.

An exception to that is an ancient town in Tekes County, Ili Kazakh Autonomous Prefecture, Xinjiang, with a shape of a ba gua.

In modern China, many SEZs (special economic zones) are developed from scratch according to extensive planning, for example, Pudong, a new district of Shanghai. There are also new areas that showcase new visions for urban planning, which in some cases are SEZs in their own right. For example, Xiong'an is a planned city being built in an area of former small towns and farm fields.

=== Philippines ===
Quezon City was the planned city of President Manuel L. Quezon, who had earlier proposed a new city to be built on land northeast of the City of Manila. Carefully planned districts include Santa Mesa Heights (part of the original Burnham Plan for Manila), the Diliman Estate (includes the University of the Philippines), New Manila, the Cubao Commercial District, South Triangle, Housing Projects 1 (Roxas District), 2 and 3 (Quirino District), 4, 5 (Kamias-Kamuning District), 6, 7, and 8.

President Elpidio Quirino proclaimed Quezon City as the national capital on 17 July 1948, with President Ferdinand Marcos restoring Manila as the capital on 24 June 1976. He then created a metropolitan area called Metro Manila, which remains congested today due to failed execution of the Quezon City plan as well as the Burnham Plan.

Other planned cities (in order of foundation):

- Baguio
- Trece Martires, Cavite
- Island Garden City of Samal
- Palayan, Nueva Ecija
- New Clark City

=== Saudi Arabia ===
King Abdullah Economic City, a future planned city along the Red Sea located in Saudi Arabia.

In 1975, Jubail Industrial City, also known as Jubail, was designated as a new industrial city by the Saudi government. It provides 50% of the country's drinking water through desalination of the water from the Persian Gulf.

=== Singapore ===
The new town planning concept was introduced into Singapore with the building of the first New Town, Queenstown, from July 1952 to 1973 by the country's public housing authority, the Housing and Development Board. Today, the vast majority of the approximately 11,000 public housing buildings are organised into 22 new towns across the country.

Each new town is designed to be completely self-sustainable. Helmed by a hierarchy of commercial developments, ranging from a town centre to precinct-level outlets, there is no need to venture out of town to meet the most common needs of residences. Employment can be found in industrial estates located within several towns. Educational, health care, and recreational needs are also taken care of with the provision of schools, hospitals, parks, sports complexes, and so on.

Singapore's expertise in successful new town design was internationally recognised when the Building and Social Housing Foundation (BSHF) of the United Nations awarded the World Habitat Award to Tampines New Town, which was selected as a representative of Singapore's new towns, on 5 October 1992.

=== South Korea ===
Since 2007 Sejong was planned as the new capital, but it is becoming the de facto administrative capital instead, with many national government agencies and research institutes moving there between 2013 and present. It has a planned population of 0.8 million, which is the largest of all the newtown development plans. The head of the domestic-administration, the Prime Minister of South Korea also resides in Sejong, along with more than 65% of the South Korea's government facilities.

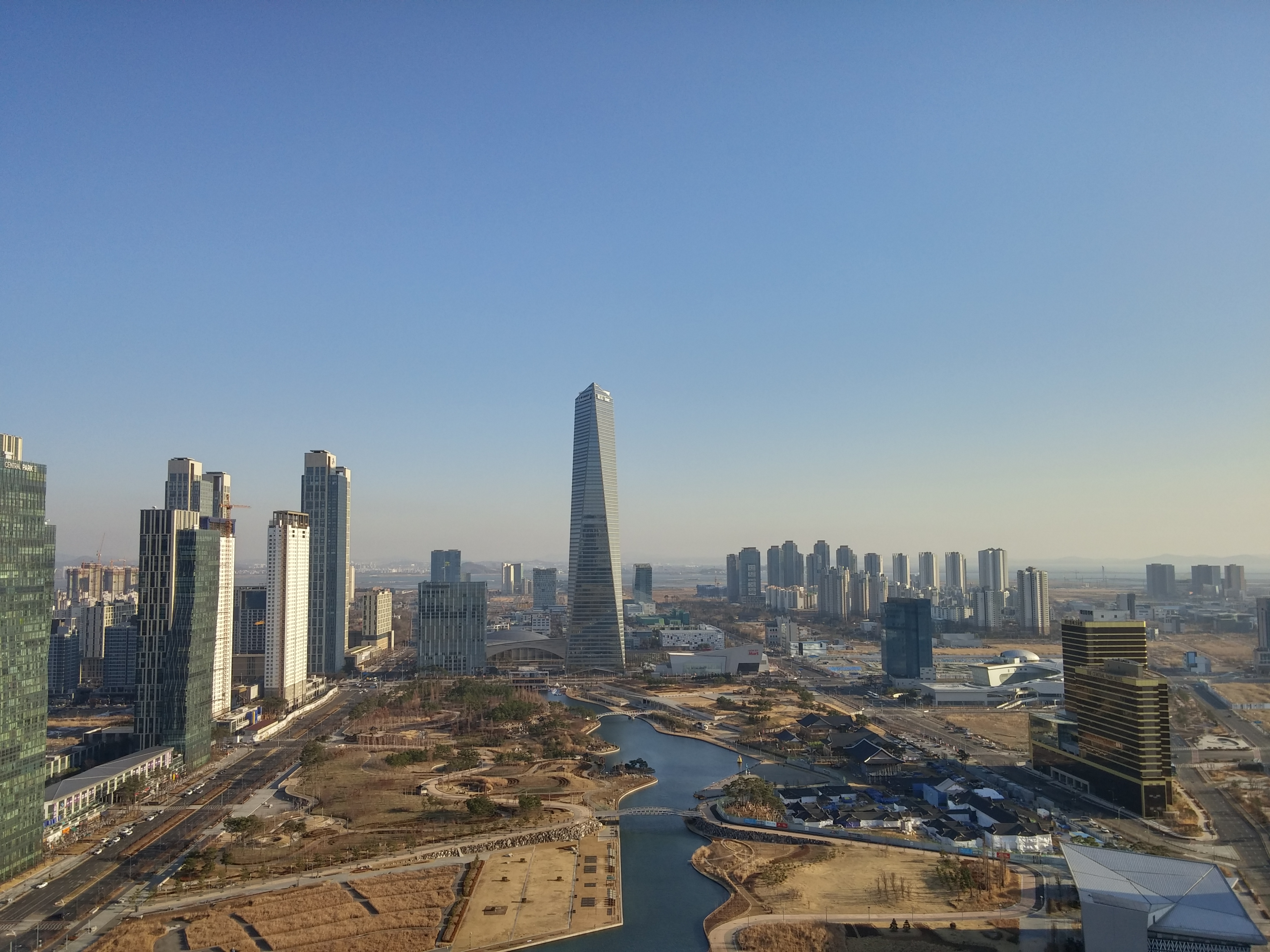
Songdo in South Korea

New Songdo City is a planned international business centre to be developed on 6 square kilometres of reclaimed land along Incheon's waterfront, 65 kilometres west of Seoul and connected to Incheon International Airport by a 10-kilometre highway bridge. This 10-year development project is estimated to cost in excess of $40 billion, making it the largest private development project ever undertaken anywhere in the world.

Gwanggyo New Town is located 25 km south away from Seoul in Suwon city and Youngin city, Gyeonggi province. Gwanggyo newtown area 11 square kilometers was designated in 2004 by Gyeonggi Province, Suwon city, Youngin city, and Gyeonggi Development Corporation (GICO). It will accommodate more than 31,000 households. Gwanggyo newtown was not only for the housing supply but also for several regional goals such as provincial office movement, convention center building, and creating economic growth core in Gyeonggi provincial area. Its infrastructure was scheduled to be constructed by 2012.

Since the 1990s, several planned communities were built in the Seoul Metropolitan Area to alleviate housing demands in Seoul. They include:

- Several ongoing developments in Hwaseong, including Bongdam, Dongtan1 & 2, and Hyangnam, Suji in Yongin.
- Gangnam, Seocho & Jamsil, Southern Seoul called Gangnam
- Bundang, Seongnam City
- Ilsan, Goyang City
- Hwajeong, Goyang City
- Jungdong, Bucheon
- Pyeongchon, Anyang
- Sanbon, Gunpo
- Dongtan1, Hwaseong
- Dongtan2, East Hwaseong: The largest in South Korea with more than 100,000 flats and 300,000 inhabitants
- Pangyo, Seongnam City
- Wirye, SE Seoul
- Haewun dae in East Busan.
- Myeongji in West Busan
- Dunsan in Daejeon after relocating air field site development.

=== Taiwan ===
After losing the Chinese Civil War, the central government of China and its government forces retreated to the former Qing province and later Japanese colony of the island of Taiwan, which was still a Japanese territory under Allied occupation. As a result, Nationalist forces constructed several military dependents' villages that were intended to be temporary housing for party members and their families to regain Mainland China from the Communists. Many of these neighborhoods became permanent and still exist today.

Beginning in the 1950s, the Taiwan Provincial Government was moved out of Taipei to central Taiwan for security reasons. Several new planned communities were created to house these government employees. The first planned community under the background was Guangfu New Village, located in Wufeng, Taichung. After Guangfu New Village, other communities were created as well:

- Zhongxing New Village, the seat of the provincial government, Nantou County
- Liming New Village, Taichung City

In the 1970s, several new cities were planned to help alleviate the overpopulation in Taiwan's largest cities, including Linkou New Town and Danhai New Town to alleviate Taipei downtown's overpopulation, Dapingding new town to alleviate Kaohsiung downtown. Most of the new city plans during the time did not succeed due to strong opposition from locals and negative responses from various government departments.

Taichung's 7th Redevelopment Zone, which is located in Taichung, Taiwan, was a major planned community. Before Taichung's 7th Redevelopment Zone Plan, only a few farmhouses were scattered along a limited number of narrow streets. Today, this area the new central business district (CBD) of Taichung, away from the city's Central District. It features broad and widely spaced boulevards, large apartments complexes, department stores, and office towers. There are many universities nearby, such as Tunghai University and Feng Chia University.

=== Turkey ===
Some parts of the biggest city, Istanbul, are being re-developed and re-planned.

The capital, Ankara, was built by a plan and is constantly re-planned.

Atça, Aydın was burned down by Greek forces in the Turkish Independence War. The rebuilding plan was based on Paris' plan.

Erzincan, Karabük, Kars, Kayseri, Konya were also planned cities.

=== United Arab Emirates ===
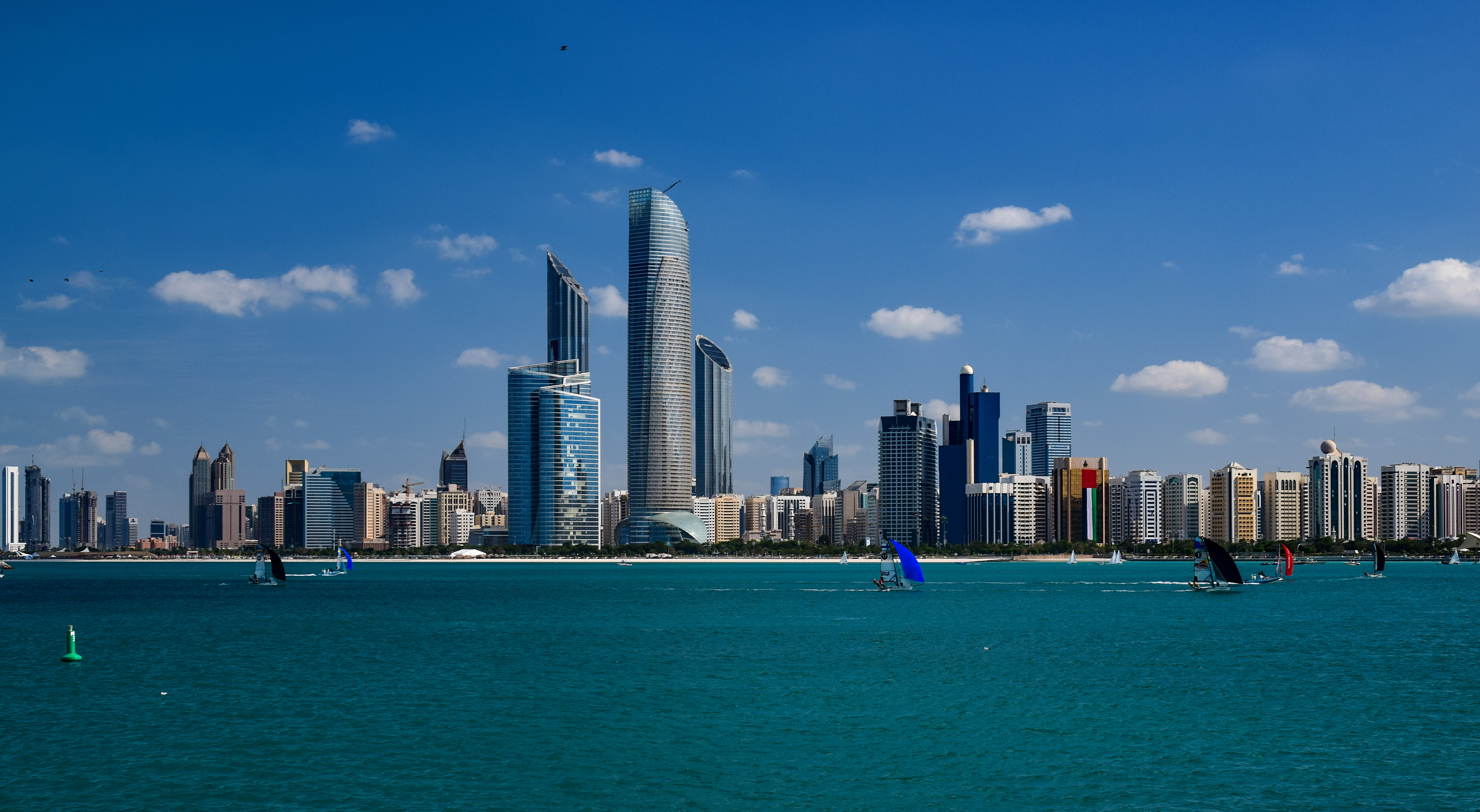
Abu Dhabi

- Capital city of Abu Dhabi is a planned city to some extent.
- New Khalifa City, part of Abu Dhabi's Vision 2030 new city plan.
- Certain new parts of Dubai are planned.
- Masdar City, conceived of as a mixed purpose residential and commercial area.

=== South Asia ===
==== Ancient history ====
An urban culture is evident in the mature phase of Indus Valley civilization which thrived in present-day Pakistan and north western India from around 3300 BC. The quality of municipal city planning suggests knowledge of urban planning and efficient municipal governments which placed a high priority on hygiene. The streets of major cities in present-day Pakistan such as Mohenjo-daro and Harappa, the world's earliest planned cities, were laid out in a perfect grid pattern comparable to that of present-day New York City. The houses were protected from noise, odours, and thieves.

As seen in the ancient sites of Harappa and Mohenjo-daro in Pakistan and western border of India, this urban plan included the world's first urban sanitation systems. Within the city, individual homes or groups of homes obtained water from wells. From a room that appears to have been set aside for bathing, waste water was directed to covered drains, which lined the major streets. Houses opened only to inner courtyards and smaller lanes.

The ancient Indus systems of sewage and drainage that were developed and used in cities throughout the Indus Valley were far more advanced than any found in contemporary urban sites in the Middle East and even more efficient than those in some areas of modern South Asia today. The advanced architecture of the Harappans is shown by their dockyards, granaries, warehouses, brick platforms, and protective walls.

==== Medieval history ====
A number of medieval Indian cities were planned including:

- Ahmedabad in Gujarat. Established by Sultan Ahmad Shah in 1411.
- Jaipur in Rajasthan. Established in 1727 by Maharaja Sawai Jai Singh II.It is the capital of Rajasthan state of India.
- Udaipur in Rajasthan. It was the historic capital of the former kingdom of Mewar.
- Thanjavur in Tamil Nadu Which was the Capital of Chola dynasty During the Rule King Raja Raja Cholan
- Madurai, in the state of Tamil Nadu. It was the capital of the erstwhile Pandyan kingdom and is noted for its lotus-like symmetry.
- Fatehpur Sikri in Agra. Its planning was done by the Mughal emperor Akbar the Great.
- Vijayanagar in Karnataka, the capital of the erstwhile Vijayanagara Empire.
- Hampi in Karnataka, which was the former capital of the Vijayanagara Empire prior to the city of Vijayanagar.

==== Modern history ====
===== India =====
India has a number of planned cities. Some prominent planned cities are Navi Mumbai, Noida, Dholera, Amaravati, New Delhi and Chandigarh. Noida was one of the most successful experiments as a planned city, undertaken by the State Government. It was divided into sectors, with residential and commercial zones, local water tanks and electricity distributors.

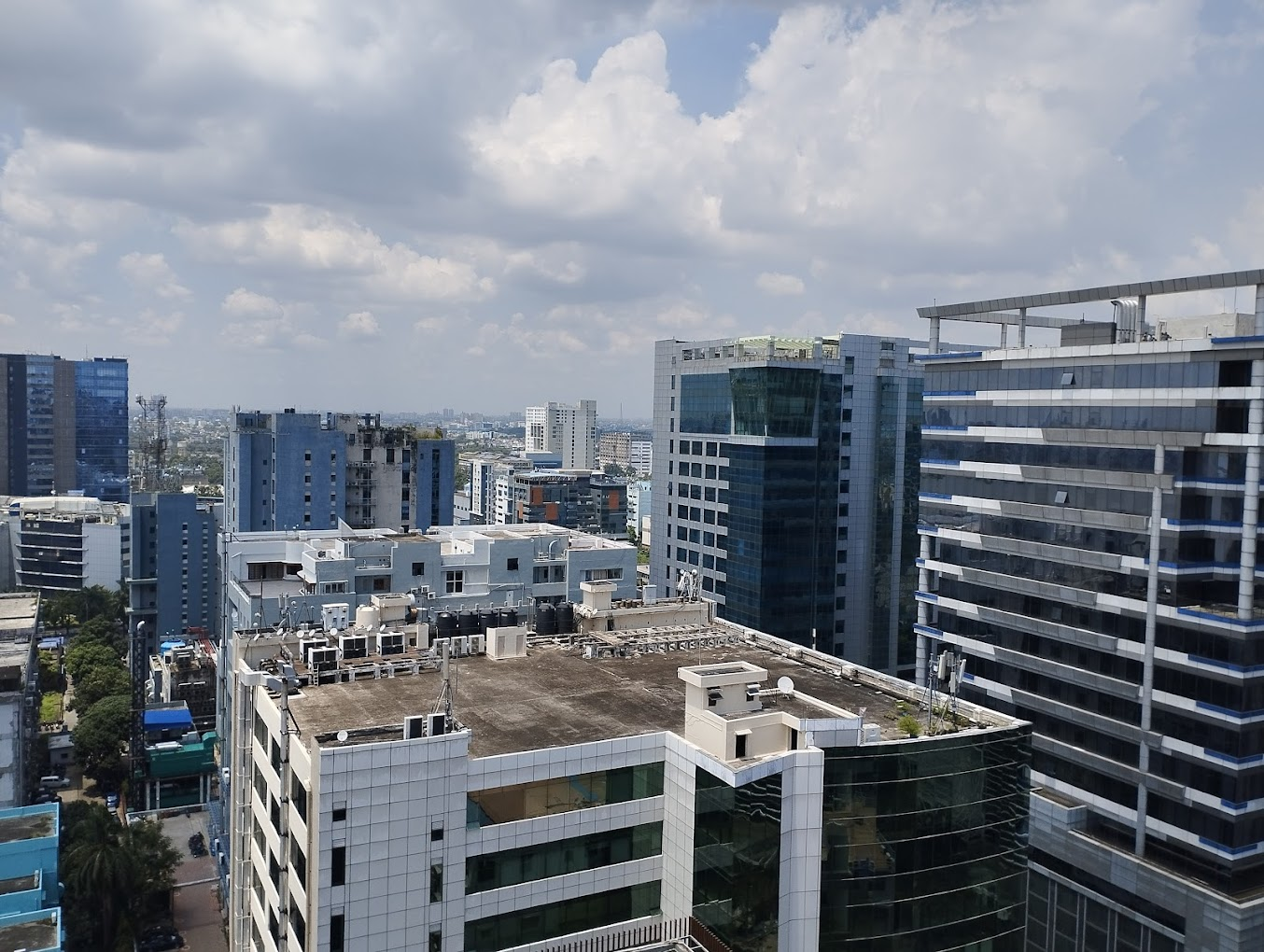
Bidhannagar (Salt Lake City), Kolkata

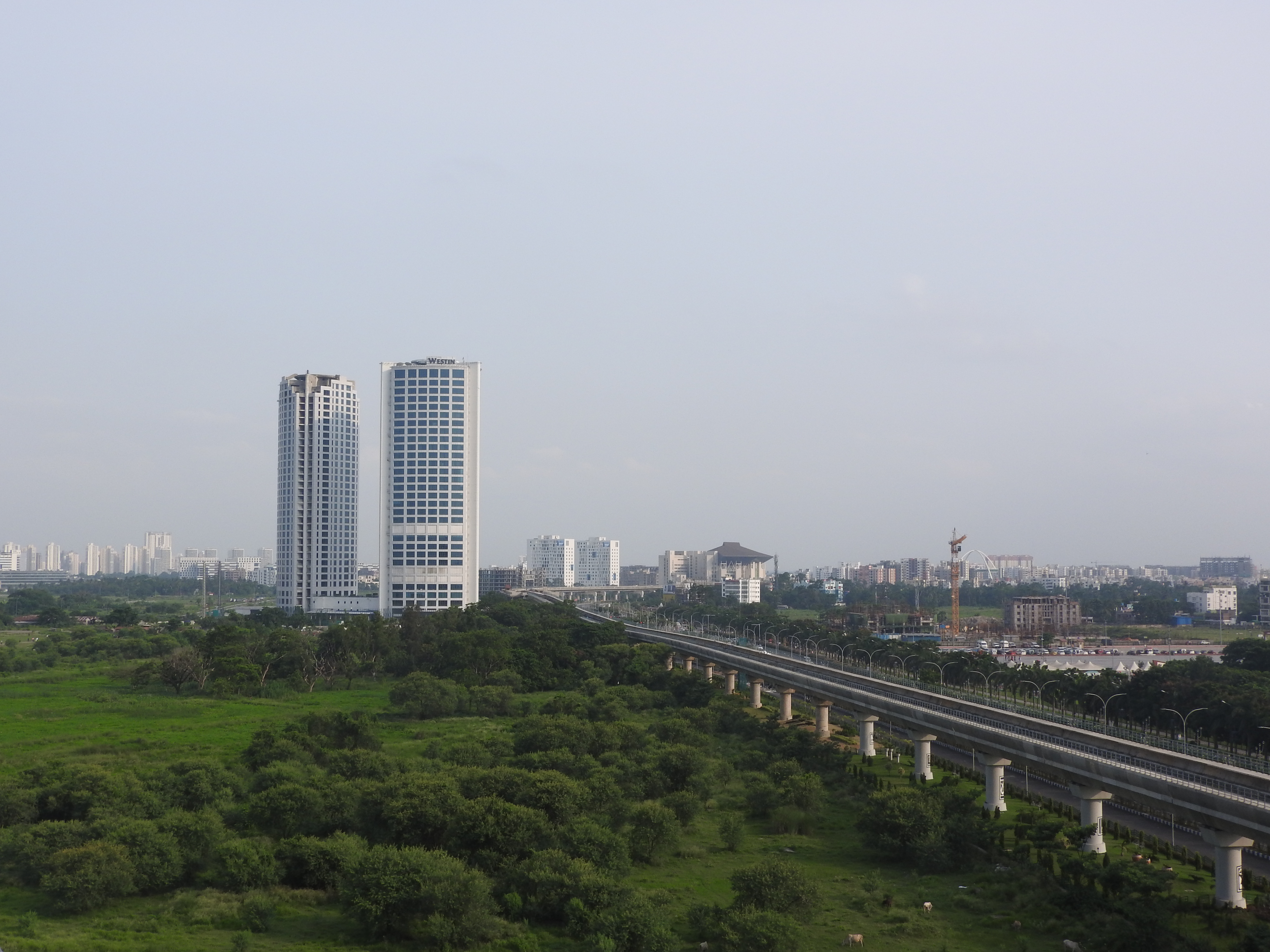
New Town, Kolkata

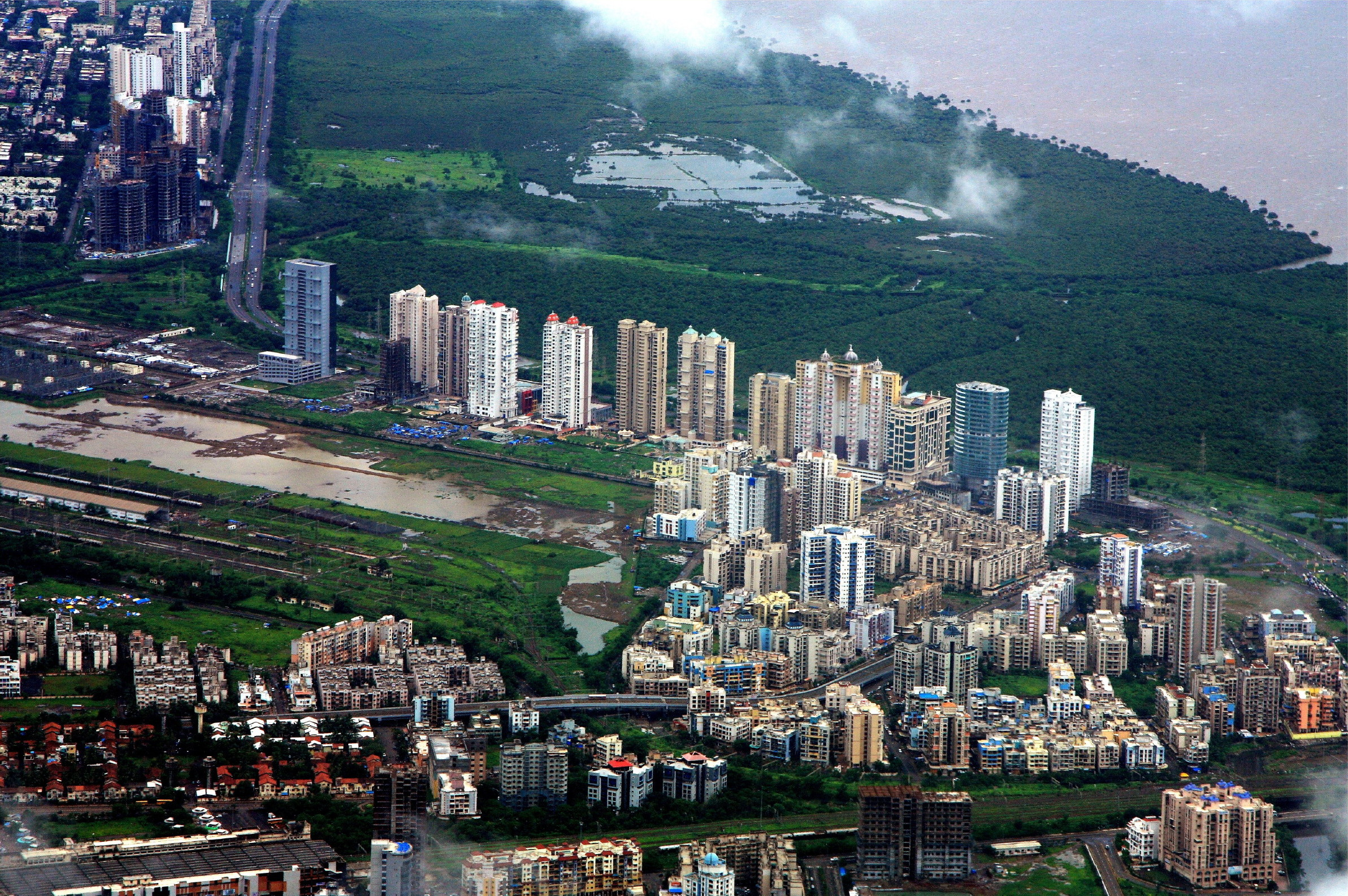
Navi Mumbai, Maharashtra

The period following independence saw India being defined into smaller geographical regions. New states such as Gujarat were formed with planned capital cities.

The major planned cities of India include:

- Amaravati, the capital of Andhra Pradesh
- Auroville
- Bhilai, the 3rd planned township in India
- Bhubaneshwar, the capital of Odisha
- Bidhannagar, Kolkata (Salt Lake City), planned township near Kolkata
- Bokaro Steel City
- Chandigarh India's first planned city
- Dhule, Maharashtra, a city planned by the renowned architect of India, Sir Vishveshwarayya.
- Dispur first planned city in Assam
- Durgapur India's second planned city
- Gandhinagar
- Greater Noida
- Jamshedpur, planned township in Jharkhand
- Kalyani
- Lavasa
- Manesar (Gurgaon)
- Mohali
- Navi Mumbai, planned city. Contains a population of 2.6 million.
- Nava Raipur, the upcoming capital of Chhattisgarh
- New Delhi
- New Gurgaon
- New Town, Kolkata
- Noida
- Panchkula, planned city near Chandigarh & part of Chandigarh Tricity
- Patiala
- Palava
- Pimpri-Chinchwad
- Rajarhat (New Town, Kolkata), a planned township near Kolkata
- Rourkela
- Sri Ganganagar
- Vijayawada
- Vishakhapatnam
- Bhopal Habibganj township
- Bhararisain

=== Turkmenistan ===
Arkadag, named in honor of Turkmenistan's former President Gurbanguly Berdymukhamedov, is a new planned smart city in Turkmenistan. Situated to the southeast of Ashgabat, the city is designed to be a modern and innovative urban hub, reflecting Turkmenistan's aspirations for technological advancement and sustainable development. Arkadag is being developed with a focus on smart technologies, including energy efficiency, modern infrastructure, and eco-friendly solutions, while preserving Turkmen cultural heritage. This city is part of a broader vision to diversify the country's urban landscape and provide an advanced living environment for its residents.

Ashgabat, the capital of Turkmenistan, is a city that has been thoughtfully planned, with its foundations laid during the Soviet era. After Turkmenistan gained independence in 1991, the city saw considerable expansion and development. Ashgabat's layout is distinguished by monumental structures, grand government buildings, and wide avenues, many of which are made of marble. The urban development aims to showcase the national pride and Turkmen heritage, combining modern infrastructure with elements of traditional culture.

Türkmenbaşy, formerly known as Krasnovodsk, was transformed into a resort town during the Soviet era. Located on the Caspian Sea coast, the city was developed as an important port and industrial center. In 1993, after Turkmenistan gained independence, the city was renamed Türkmenbaşy in honour of the country's first president, Saparmurat Niyazov, who oversaw its further development. The city is known for its modern infrastructure, including wide streets, government buildings, and beach hotels, and serves as a major hub for the country's oil and gas industries.

== Europe ==
=== History ===
New settlements were planned in Europe at least since Greek antiquity (see article History of urban planning). The Greeks built new colonial cities around the Mediterranean. The ancient Romans also founded many new colonial towns through their empire. There are, however, also traces of planned settlements of non-Roman origin in pre-historic northern Europe. Most planned settlements of medieval Europe were created in the period of about the 12th to 14th centuries. All kinds of landlords, from the highest to the lowest rank, tried to found new villages and towns on their estates, to gain economic, political or military power. The settlers generally were attracted by fiscal, economic and juridical advantages granted by the founding lord, or were forced to move from elsewhere from his estates. Most of the new towns were to remain rather small (as for instance the bastides of southwestern France), but some of them became important cities, such as Cardiff, Leeds, 's-Hertogenbosch, Montauban, Bilbao, Malmö, Lübeck, Munich, Berlin, Bern, Klagenfurt, Alessandria, Warsaw and Sarajevo.

==== Roman Empire ====
The Romans built a large number of towns throughout their empire, often as colonies for the settlement of citizens or veterans. These were generally characterised by a grid of streets and a planned water-supply; and many modern European towns of originally Roman foundation still retain part of the original street-grid.

=== Albania ===
During the communist period under Enver Hoxha, many towns and industrial centers were planned and built from scratch. The government aimed to distribute population and industry evenly across the country.

Some notable examples:

- Laç, built in the 1960s as an industrial town focused on chemical and construction materials production.
- Ballsh, developed around its oil refinery; designed as a compact socialist industrial city.
- Patos (municipality), expanded in a planned manner around oil extraction sites.
- Rrëshen, created as the administrative center of Mirditë District; planned in the 1950s–1960s.
- Pogradec (partially), had elements of socialist urban planning (wide boulevards, public housing, industrial zones).

=== Belarus ===
Belarus has several planned towns, all built during the 1950s – 1970s from Komsomol rapid construction projects. These planned towns include:

- Salihorsk, built anew to host the population of Belaruskali workers
- Svietlahorsk, built on site of Shatsilki village to host population of Svetlahorsk power plant, Svetlahorsk chemical textile plant and Svietlahorsk cellulose-cardboard combinate.
- Navapolatsk, built to host the population of Naftan Oil Refinery workers
- Novalukoml, built to host workers of Lukoml power plant

=== Belgium ===
As many Roman army camps, the settlement of Atuatuca Tungrorum, on the site of the modern town of Tongeren, grew into an important regional centre, laid out along a grid plan and supplied with water by an aqueduct. While Tongeren's administrative and military functions were moved to Maastricht in the wake of Germanic invasions in the 350s, given the latter's better strategic position, remains of the Roman town are visible up to this day.

Named after king Charles II of Spain, the town of Charleroi (or Caroloregium, in Latin) was founded in 1666 as a stronghold near the French border, to fend off potential invasions. A few years before, in 1659, the border between France and the Spanish Netherlands had shifted northward due to the Treaty of the Pyrenees. This shift, and the consequent loss of fortified border towns such as Cambrai and Avesnes had sparked the need to found new forts to defend the border. The original fortifications were destroyed between 1867 and 1871, making place for a quickly expanding industrial centre.

In 1923, the city of Antwerp annexed the sparsely populated, marshy lands known as Vlaams Hoofd, with the intention of using the area for urban development. Over the following decades, the terrain was elevated and a new urban community, now called Linkeroever (literally 'Left Bank'), was created. Notably, Le Corbusier submitted a plan along the lines of his Cité radieuse but neither his plan nor those of his colleagues were accepted. Instead, Linkeroever was developed gradually over the 20th and 21st centuries, inspired by a mix of modernist and later ideas.

When the Catholic University of Leuven was split along linguistic lines in 1968, it was decided to move its French-speaking division, the Université catholique de Louvain, from Leuven (in the Flemish Region) to a new location, some 30 kilometers south, in the Walloon Region. Construction on the town of Louvain-la-Neuve (literally 'New Louvain') began in the 1970s, in what had previously been the mostly empty countryside near the village of Ottignies. Its city centre is supported by a concrete structure, allowing car traffic to pass underneath and making the city centre a pedestrian zone.

=== Bosnia and Herzegovina ===
- Slobomir is a new town in Republika Srpska and its name means: "the city of freedom and peace". It is located on the Drina river near Bijeljina. It was founded by Slobodan Pavlović, a Bosnian Serb philanthropist. It aims to be one of the major cities of post-war Bosnia and Herzegovina. In fact, the city will be located in two countries, Bosnia and Herzegovina and Serbia, although majority of it will be in Bosnia and Herzegovina. The city is named after its founder, Slobodan Pavlović, and his wife, Mira.
- Andrićgrad is a town under construction by the famous Serbian director Emir Kusturica, and will be located in Višegrad, Republika Srpska.

=== Bulgaria ===
The cities of Stara Zagora and Kazanlak, in central Bulgaria, were rebuilt as planned cities after they were burnt to the ground in the 1877–1878 Russo-Turkish War. Also the city of Dimitrovgrad in south Bulgaria, that was planned as a key industrial and infrastructure center.

=== Croatia ===
Červar-Porat is a resort town in western Croatia, located on the east coast of the Adriatic Sea on the Červar lagoon. It was built as a planned town in the 1970s, although the area was inhabited in Roman times. During the War of Independence it was used as a camp for refugees from Bosnia and Herzegovina and Vukovar. It was planned to house 6500 people.

Raša in Istria was built as a "new town" during 1936–1937 as part of Mussolini's urban colonization of Istria and other Italian territories.

The capital of Zagreb underwent major expansion during the 1960s. By that time, the city's official boundary was the river Sava, since nothing was built over it. After a flood in the 1960s, many residents were moved and some other districts were created for the residents, such as Dubrava, which was the interconnection between the Zagreb's old part and Sesvete. During the 1960s and 1970s, a planned part of Zagreb, Novi Zagreb (New Zagreb), was constructed, which is on the other, previously uninhabited part of the river Sava, and is now one of major districts consisting of purely residential buildings and blocks. It is still under expansion and some new landmarks were built in it, the most famous one being the recent one, Arena Zagreb, built in 2008.

=== Czech Republic ===
The New Town of Prague was founded in 1348 by the King and Emperor Charles IV. This expansion made Prague, the new imperial seat, the third largest city in Europe by area at that time.

Poruba and Havířov were established in the 1950s as new satellite residential towns for workers of coal-mining, steel-mill and other heavy-industry complex in the Ostrava region.

Prague was extended by large housing estates – "new towns" in the 1970s and 1980s: Severní Město (Northern Town), Jižní Město (Southern Town), Jihozápadní Město (South-Western Town) were the largest, with population around 100.000 each. Their remote position to the city centre was compensated for by underground lines constructed usually a decade after the completion of the housing projects. A new housing estate called Západní Město (Western Town) is currently (2017) partly under construction (Britská čtvrť) and partly in planning stage.

=== Denmark ===
Fredericia was founded in 1650 as a combined market town and military town following the Thirty Years' War. Similarly, the North Sea port city of Esbjerg was constructed in 1868 following the loss of Altona (now part of Hamburg).

More recent examples are Græse Bakkeby in North Zealand, and Ørestad (a district of Copenhagen), planned and built to strengthen development in the Copenhagen/Malmö region. The suburb of Albertslund was also built from scratch in the 1970s, merging the villages Vridsløselille and Herstedvester.

In 2017, plans for a new 20,000-inhabitant town outside Frederikssund named Vinge were approved by the Danish authorities.

=== Finland ===
The city of Helsinki, previously a town of 5,000 inhabitants, was made the capital of the new Grand Duchy of Finland in 1812 by decree of Alexander I, Emperor of Russia. The city center was rebuilt with the lead of the German architect Carl Ludvig Engel.

However, the last town in Finland that was ordered to be built on a previously completely uninhabited land was Raahe, founded by governor general Per Brahe the Younger in 1649.

The city of Vaasa was rebuilt about seven kilometers northwest of its original location in 1862, after a fire which destroyed the city in 1852. The new town was planned by Carl Axel Setterberg. The disastrous consequences of the fire were considered as the design included five broad avenues which divided the town into sections and each block was divided by alleys.

Hamina is an old Finnish Eastern trade capital, founded during the Swedish reign. The star-shaped fortress and the circular town plan are based on an Italian Renaissance fortress concept from the 16th century.

Finland also has various "ekokylä" communities or "ecological villages". For example, Tapiola is a post-war garden city on the edge of Espoo.

Hervanta in Tampere is a satellite city built starting from 1970s to accommodate a growing number of urban residents. It was built far from the city centre due to lower land prices. The district was intended to be as independent as possible. It includes a large university campus, the Police University College of Finland and offices of many technology companies.

=== France ===
Many new cities, called bastides, were founded from the 12th to 14th centuries in southwestern France, where the Hundred Years War took place, to replace destroyed cities and organize defence and growth. Among those, Monpazier, Beaumont, and Villeréal are good examples.

In 1517, the construction of Le Havre was ordered by Francis I of France as a new port. It was completely destroyed during the Second World War and was entirely rebuilt in a modernist style, during the Trente Glorieuses, the thirty-year period from 1945 to 1975.

Cardinal Richelieu founded the small Baroque town of Richelieu, which remains largely unchanged.

A program of new towns (French ville nouvelle) was developed in the mid-1960s to try to control the expansion of cities. Nine villes nouvelles were created.

- Near Paris: Cergy-Pontoise, Marne-la-Vallée, Sénart (former Melun-Sénart), Évry, Saint-Quentin-en-Yvelines
- Near Lille: Villeneuve d'Ascq (Former Lille-Est)
- Near Lyon: L'Isle-d'Abeau
- Near Marseille: Rives de l'Etang de Berre
- Near Rouen: Le Vaudreuil

La Défense, in the greater Paris area, could also be considered a planned town, though it was not built all at once but in successive stages beginning in the 1950s.

=== Germany ===
Planned cities in Germany are:

- Bayreuth: an example of a medieval new city
- Bremerhaven: founded as a seaport in the 19th century
- Berlin – Friedrichstadt: founded in 1691
- Eisenhüttenstadt: the "first socialist town" in Germany
- Freudenstadt: the roads follow the layout of the nine men's morris game
- Glückstadt: founded in 1617 by the Duke of Holstein, King Christian IV of Denmark
- Halle-Neustadt: a "Stadtteil" or borough in Halle, Saxony-Anhalt
- Hellerau: first German garden city founded in 1909, today part of Dresden
- Karlsruhe: the roads follow the layout of a hand-held fan with the castle being at the juncture
- Ludwigsburg: planned new capital for the duke of Württemberg
- Mannheim Quadratestadt: squares named like ranks and files on a chessboard
- Munich Maxvorstadt: the first planned city expansion of Munich was realized from 1805 to 1810 according to a raster
- Neu-Isenburg: founded in 1699 as a town of exiles by French Huguenots
- Neustrelitz: founded in 1733 with streets spreading from an octagonal market place
- Neuwied: founded in 1653
- Putbus: built around a circular centre with radially aligned streets
- Sennestadt: founded in 1956, today part of Bielefeld
- Wilhelmshaven: founded as a naval base by the Kingdom of Prussia
- Wolfsburg: founded in 1938 to host the factories for the newly built Volkswagen

Welthauptstadt Germania was the projected renewal of Berlin as a planned city, although only a small portion was constructed between 1937 and 1943.

After World War II, several expellee towns were built like Espelkamp, Neutraubling and Traunreut.

=== Greece ===
Planned cities in Greece are:

- Lakki: planned and built in the 1930s by the Italians to house members of its military stationed on the island of Leros; its initial name was Portolago
- Nea Alikarnassos: founded in 1925 to house Greek refugees from Halicarnassos, Asia Minor
- Orestiada: founded in 1922 to house Greek refugees from Orestiada, Eastern Thrace
- Paralia Distomou: planned and built to house workers of Aluminium of Greece
- Piraeus, planned to be the major port of Athens.
- Sparta: planned and built next to the ancient city, in 1834 after a decree issued by King Otto of Greece

=== Hungary ===
All Hungarian planned cities were built in the second half of the 20th century when a program of rapid industrialization was implemented by the communist government.

- The Akadémiaújtelep area of Budapest was designed in a unique geometrical fashion.
- Dunaújváros, built next to the existing village Dunapentele to provide housing for workers of a large steel factory complex. Once named after Stalin, the city maintains its importance in heavy industry even after the recession following the end of Communist era.
- Tiszaújváros, built next to the existing village Tiszaszederkény and was named after Lenin for decades. A significant chemical factory was built simultaneously.
- Kazincbarcika, created from the villages Sajókazinc, Barcika and Berente (the latter has become independent since then) in a mining area. The city and its population grew fast after the founding of a factory.
- Tatabánya, created from four already existing villages was developed into a mining town and industrial centre and shortly after its elevation to town status became the county seat of its county, a status it still maintains despite the presence of historically more significant towns in the area.
- Beloiannisz (although not a town, only a village) was planned and built in the 1950s to provide home for Greek refugees of the Civil War.
- The Wekerletelep was developed between 1908 and 1925 as a result of planned state construction in the area of Kispest in a unique lacy layout.

=== Ireland ===
In the Republic of Ireland the term "new town" is often used to refer to planned towns built after World War II which were discussed as early as 1941. The term "new town" in Ireland was also used for some earlier developments, notably during the Georgian era. Part of Limerick city was built in a planned fashion as "Newtown Pery".

In 1961 the first new town of Shannon was commenced and a target of 6,000 inhabitants was set. This has since been exceeded. Shannon is of some regional importance today as an economic centre (with the Shannon Free Zone and Shannon Airport), but until recently failed to expand in population as anticipated. Since the late 1990s, and particularly in the early 2000s, the population has been expanding at a much faster rate, with town rejuvenation, new retail and entertainment facilities and many new housing developments.

It was not until 1967 that the Wright Report planned four towns in County Dublin. These were Blanchardstown, Clondalkin, Lucan and Tallaght but they were subsequently reduced to Blanchardstown, Lucan-Clondalkin and Tallaght. These areas had previously contained small semi-rural villages on the edge of the city of Dublin, but were greatly expanded throughout the 1970s. Each of these towns has approximately 50,000 inhabitants today.

The most recent new town in Ireland is Adamstown in County Dublin. Building commenced in 2005 and it was anticipated that the occupation would commence late in 2006 with the main development of 10,500 units being completed within a ten-year timescale. As of 2017 Adamstown is complete but currently only has 3,500 out of the 25,500 planned.

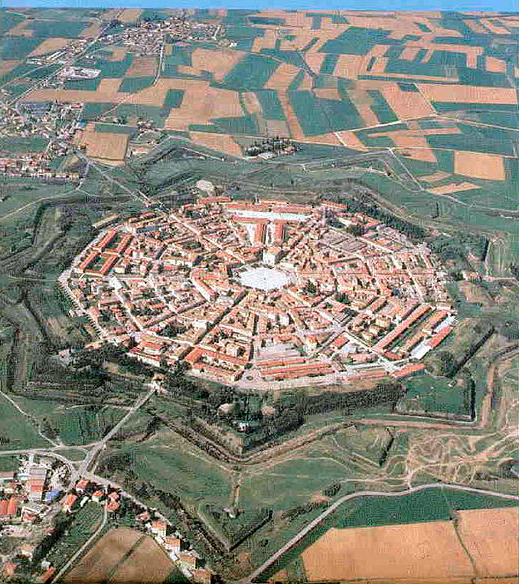
Palmanova, Italy, founded in the 16th century

=== Italy ===
A famous example of renaissance planned city is the walled star city of Palmanova. It is a derivative of ideal circular cities, namely of Filarete's imaginary Sforzinda.

In the early 20th century, during the fascist government of Benito Mussolini, many new cities were founded, the most prominent being Littoria (renamed Latina after the fall of the Fascism). The city was inaugurated on 18 December 1932. Littoria was populated with immigrants coming from Northern Italy, mainly from Friuli and Veneto.

The great Sicilian earthquake of 1693 forced the complete rebuilding on new plans of many towns.

Other well-known new cities are located close to Milan in the metropolitan area. Crespi d'Adda, a few kilometres east of Milan along the Adda River, was settled by the Crespi family. It was the first Ideal Worker's City in Italy, built close to the cotton factory. Today Crespi d'Adda is part of the Unesco World Heritage List. Cusano Milanino was settled in the first years of the 20th century in the formerly small town of Cusano. It was built as a new green city, rich in parks, villas, large boulevards and called Milanino (Little Milan).

=== Lithuania ===
In 1961 Elektrėnai was established as planned city for workers in Elektrėnai Power Plant and in 1975 Visaginas was established as planned city for workers in Ignalina Nuclear Power Plant.

=== Malta ===
- The fortified cities of Senglea and Valletta were both built on a grid plan by the Knights of Malta in the 16th century.
- The town of Paola, also known as Raħal Ġdid (New Town), is built on a grid plan by the Grand Master Antoine de Paule.
- The towns of San Ġwann and Santa Luċija were built as planned cities in the 1960s and 1970s

=== Netherlands ===
One of the 12 provinces of the Netherlands, Flevoland (pop. 437,000 in 2022), was reclaimed from the Zuiderzee (Southern Sea). After a flood in 1916, it was decided that the Zuiderzee, an inland sea within the Netherlands, would be closed and reclaimed. In 1932, a causeway (the Afsluitdijk) was completed, which closed off the sea completely. The Zuiderzee was subsequently called IJsselmeer (IJssel Lake), and its previously salty water became fresh.

The first part of the new lake that was reclaimed was the Noordoostpolder (Northeast Polder). This new land included, among others, the former island of Urk, and it was included with the province of Overijssel. After this, other parts were also reclaimed: the eastern part in 1957 (Oost-Flevoland) and the southern part (Zuid-Flevoland) in 1968. The municipalities on the three parts voted to become a separate province, which happened in 1986.

The capital of Flevoland is Lelystad, but the biggest city is Almere (pop. 219,000 in 2022), which was founded in 1975. Apart from these two larger cities, several 'new villages' were built. In the Noordoostpolder, the central town of Emmeloord is surrounded by ten villages, all in cycling distance from Emmeloord since that was the most popular way of transport in the 1940s (and it is still very popular). Most noteworthy of these villages is Nagele which was designed by famous modern architects of the time, Gerrit Rietveld, Aldo van Eyck, Willem Wissing and Jaap Bakema among them. The other villages were built in a more traditional, or vernacular, style. In the more recent Flevolandpolders, four more 'new villages' were built. Initially, more villages were planned, but the introduction of cars made fewer but larger villages possible.

New towns outside Flevoland are Hoofddorp and IJmuiden near Amsterdam, Hellevoetsluis and Spijkenisse near Rotterdam and the navy port Den Helder. Elburg is an example of a planned city in the medieval period.

The cities of Almere, Capelle aan den IJssel, Haarlemmermeer (also a reclaimed polder, 19th century), Nieuwegein, Purmerend and Zoetermeer are members of the European New Town Platform.

=== North Macedonia ===
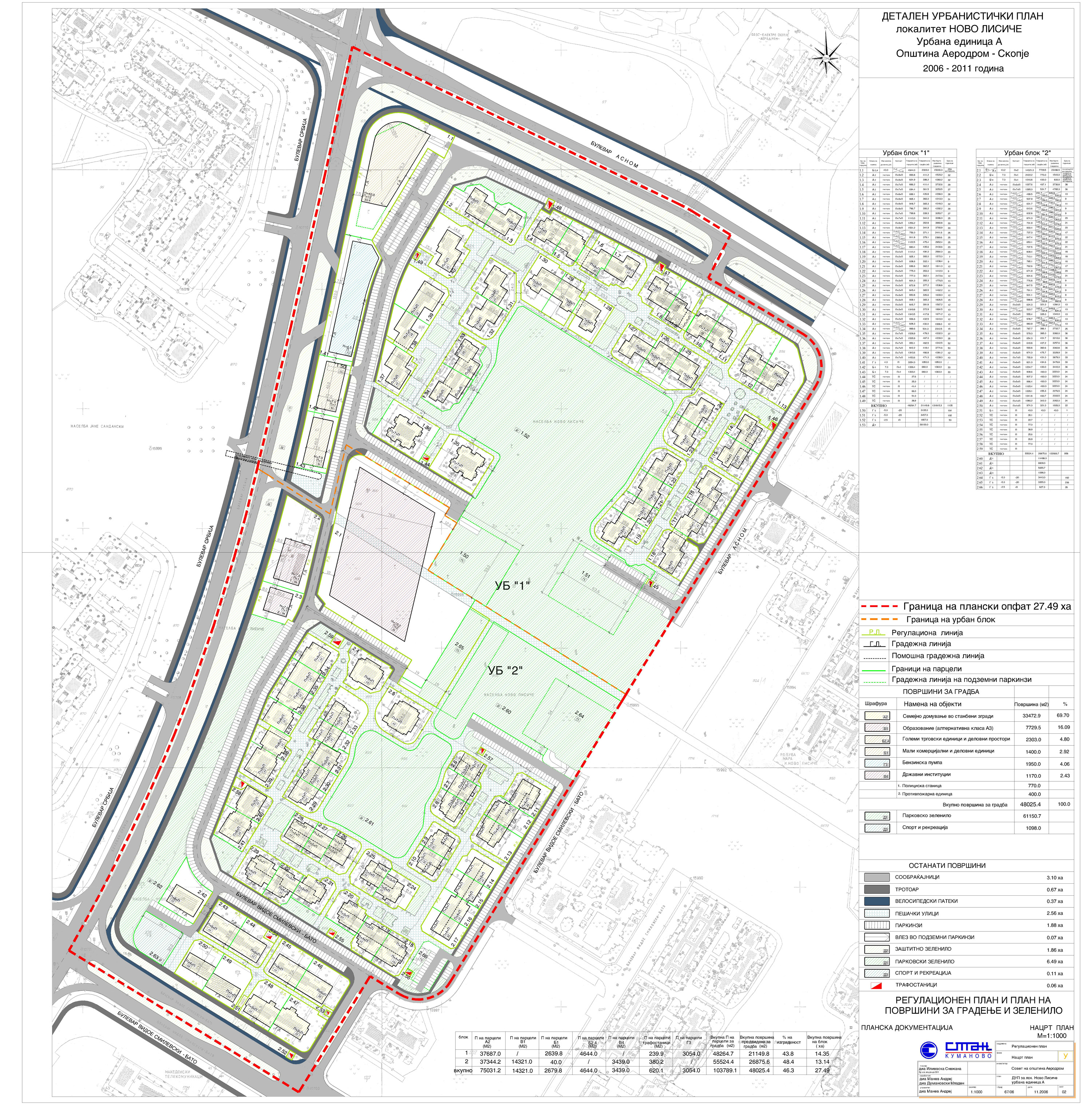
The graphical scheme of the Detailed Urbanist Plan for a settlement within the Municipality of Aerodrom within the City of Skopje, Republic of North Macedonia

The Municipality of Aerodrom within the city of Skopje is a planned community.

=== Norway ===
- Oslo: After a great fire in 1624, it was decided by King Christian IV that the city would be moved behind the Akershus fortress. The new town, named Christiania, was laid out in a grid and is now the downtown area known as "Kvadraturen" (the Quadrature). The original town of Oslo was later incorporated into Christiania, and is now a neighborhood in eastern Oslo; Gamlebyen or "The Old City".
- The city of Kristiansand was formally founded in 1641 by King Christian IV. The city was granted all trade privileges on the southern coast of Norway, denying all other towns to trade with foreign states. As Oslo/Christiania before it, the city was behind a fortress, with a grid system allowing cannons to fire towards the two ports of the city and the river on the eastern end.

=== Poland ===
Four cities stand out as examples of planned communities in Poland: Zamość, Gdynia, Tychy and Nowa Huta. Their very diverse layouts are the result of the different aesthetics that were held as ideal during the development of each of these planned communities. Planned cities in Poland have a long history and fall primarily into three time periods during which planned towns developed in Poland and its neighbors that once comprised the Polish–Lithuanian Commonwealth. These are the Nobleman's Republic (16th to 18th centuries), the interwar period (1918–1939) and Socialist Realism (1944–1956).

==== The Nobleman's Republic of the Polish–Lithuanian Commonwealth ====
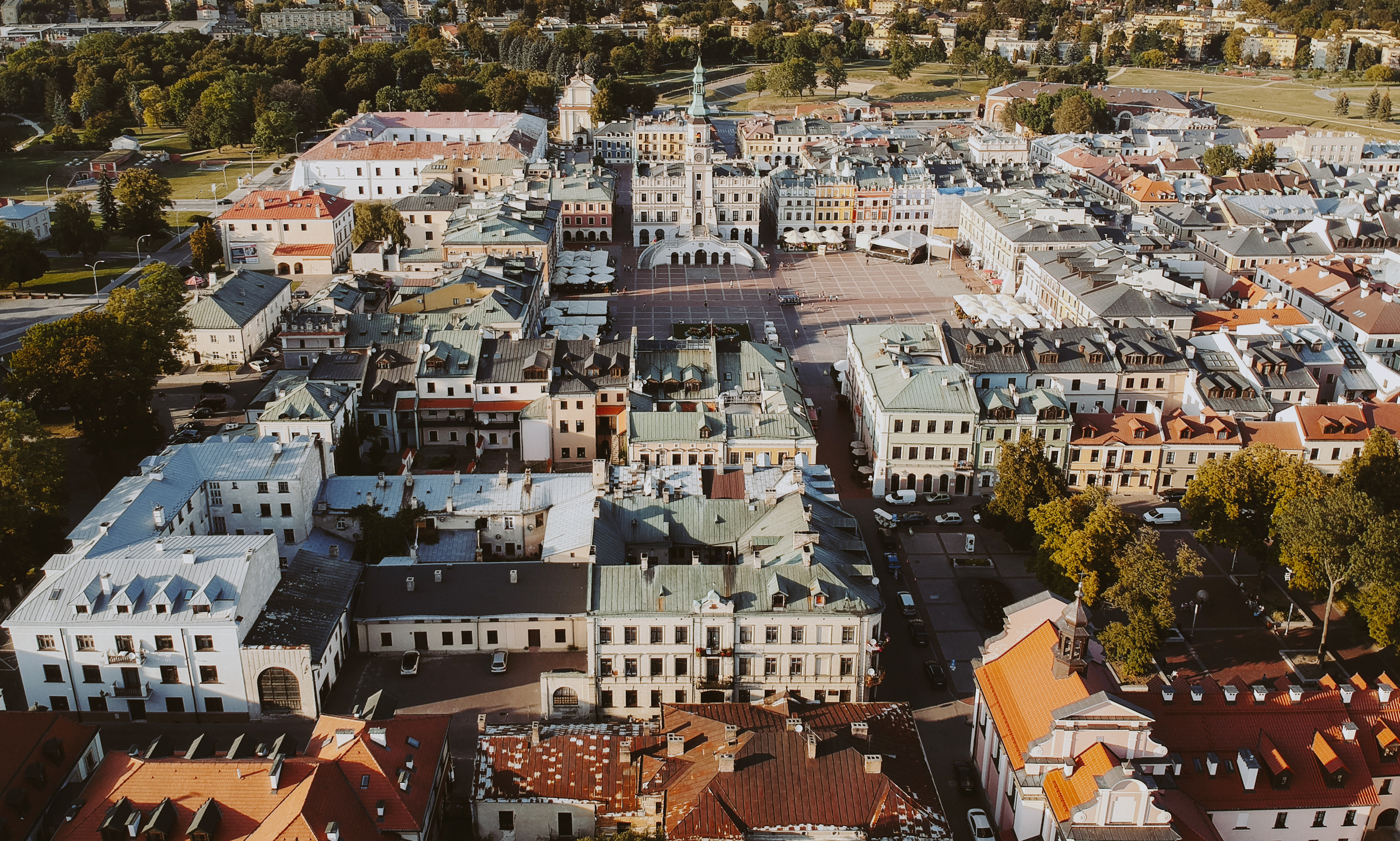
Zamość

The extreme opulence that Poland's nobility enjoyed during the Renaissance left Poland's elites with not only obscene amounts of money to spend, but also motivated them to find new ways to invest their hefty fortunes out of the grasp of the Royal Treasury. Jan Zamoyski founded the city of Zamość to circumvent royal tariffs and duties while also serving as the capital for his mini-state. Zamość was planned by the renowned Paduan architect Bernardo Morando and modeled on Renaissance theories of the 'ideal city'. Realizing the importance of trade, Zamoyski issued special location charters for representatives of peoples traditionally engaged in trade, i.e. to Greeks, Armenians and Sephardic Jews and secured exemptions on taxes, customs duties and tolls, which contributed to its fast development. Zamoyski's success with Zamość spawned numerous other Polish nobles to found their own "private" cities such as Białystok and many of these towns survive today, while Zamość was added to the UN World Heritage list in 1992 and is today considered one of the most precious urban complexes in Europe and in the world.

==== Interwar period ====
The preeminent example of a planned community in interwar Poland is Gdynia. After World War I when Poland regained its independence it lacked a commercial seaport (De iure Poles could use Gdańsk, which was the main port of the country before the War and is again today, but de facto the Germans residing in the city made it almost impossible for them), making it necessary to build one from scratch. The extensive and modern seaport facilities in Gdynia, the most modern and extensive port facilities in Europe at the time, became Poland's central port on the Baltic Sea. In the shadow of the port, the city took shape mirroring in its scope the rapid development of 19th-century Chicago, growing from a small fishing village of 1,300 in 1921 into a full blown city with a population over 126,000 less than 20 years later. The Central Business District that developed in Gdynia is a showcase of Art Deco and Modernist architectural styles and predominate much of the cityscape. There are also villas, particularly in the city's villa districts such as Kamienna Góra where Historicism inspired Neo-Renaissance and Neo-Baroque architecture.

==== Socialist realism ====
After the destruction of most Polish cities in World War II, the Communist government that took power in Poland sought to bring about architecture that was in line with its vision of society. Thus urban complexes arose that reflected the ideals of socialist realism. This can be seen in districts of Polish cities such as Warsaw's MDM. The City of Nowa Huta (now a district of Kraków) and Tychy were built as the epitome of the proletarian future of Poland.

=== Portugal ===
Vila Real de Santo António was built after the 1755 Lisbon earthquake, on the same model that was used for rebuilding Lisbon, Portugal's capital city (also destroyed in the earthquake), and on a similar orthogonal plan.

=== Romania ===
The cities of Brăila, Giurgiu and Turnu Severin were rebuilt, according to new plans, in the first part of the 19th century and the cities of Alexandria and Călărași were built completely new the same time. The town of Victoria, located in Brașov County, was built by the communist government starting in the late 1940s. The town of Motru in Oltenia dates to the 1960s.

=== Russia ===
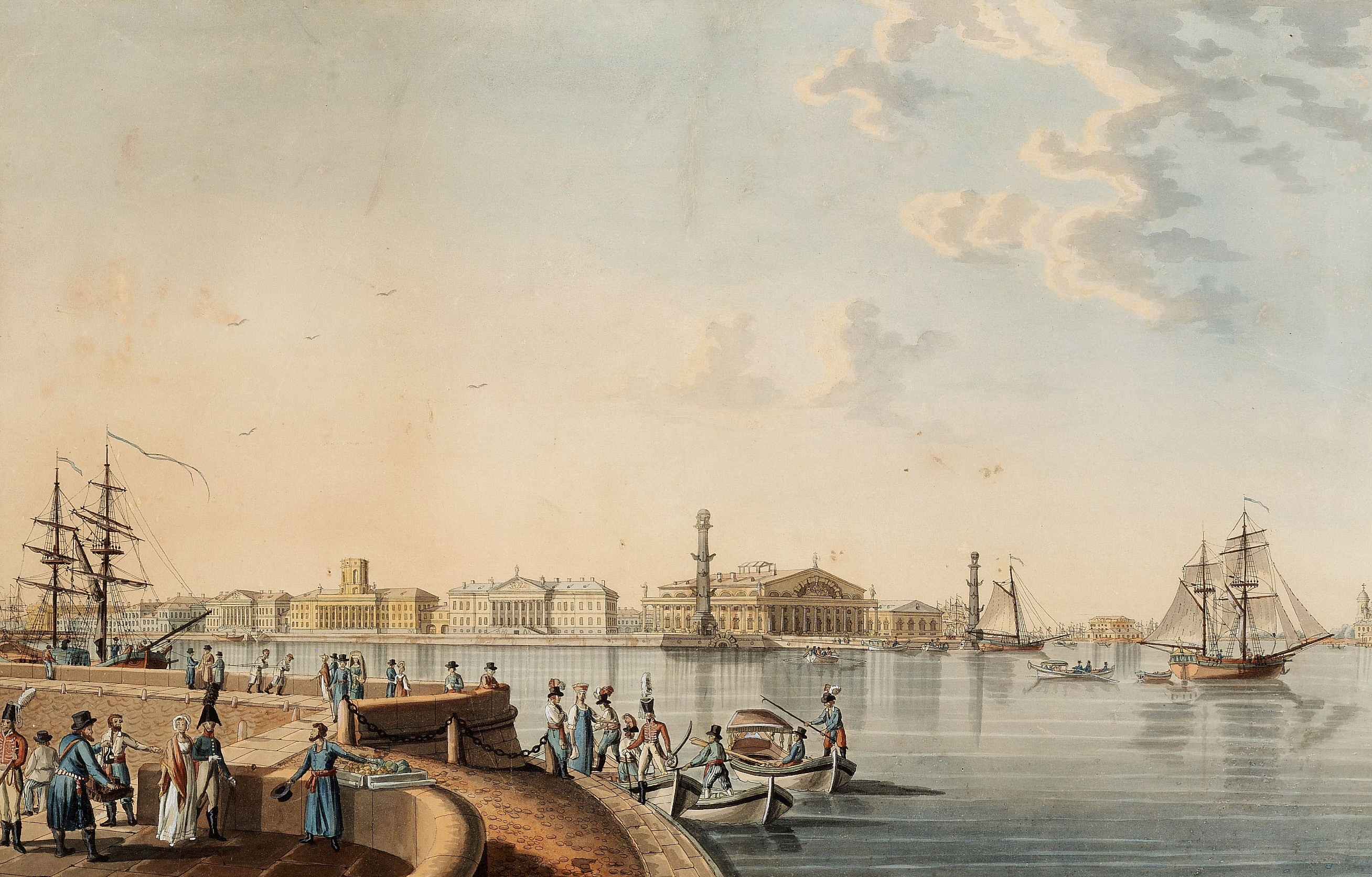
Saint Petersburg in 1807

- Saint Petersburg was built by Peter the Great as a planned capital city starting in 1703, particularly due to his interests in seafaring and the pursuit of maritime affairs with Europe, as well as the inconvenient locations of both Moscow and Arkhangelsk, which were two important trade centers at the time.
- Magnitogorsk is an example of a planned industrial city based on Stalin's 1930s five-year plans.
- The Avtozavodsky district of Tolyatti is a planned industrial city of Soviet post-war modernism.
- Kostomuksha was built as a mining town in a Finnish-Russian cooperation in the 1970s–1980s.
- Zelenograd was planned as a center for textile industries and was re-oriented as the center for Soviet electronics and microelectronics. Today, it hosts a computer industry known as the "Soviet/Russian Silicon Valley", and remains an important center of electronics in modern Russia.

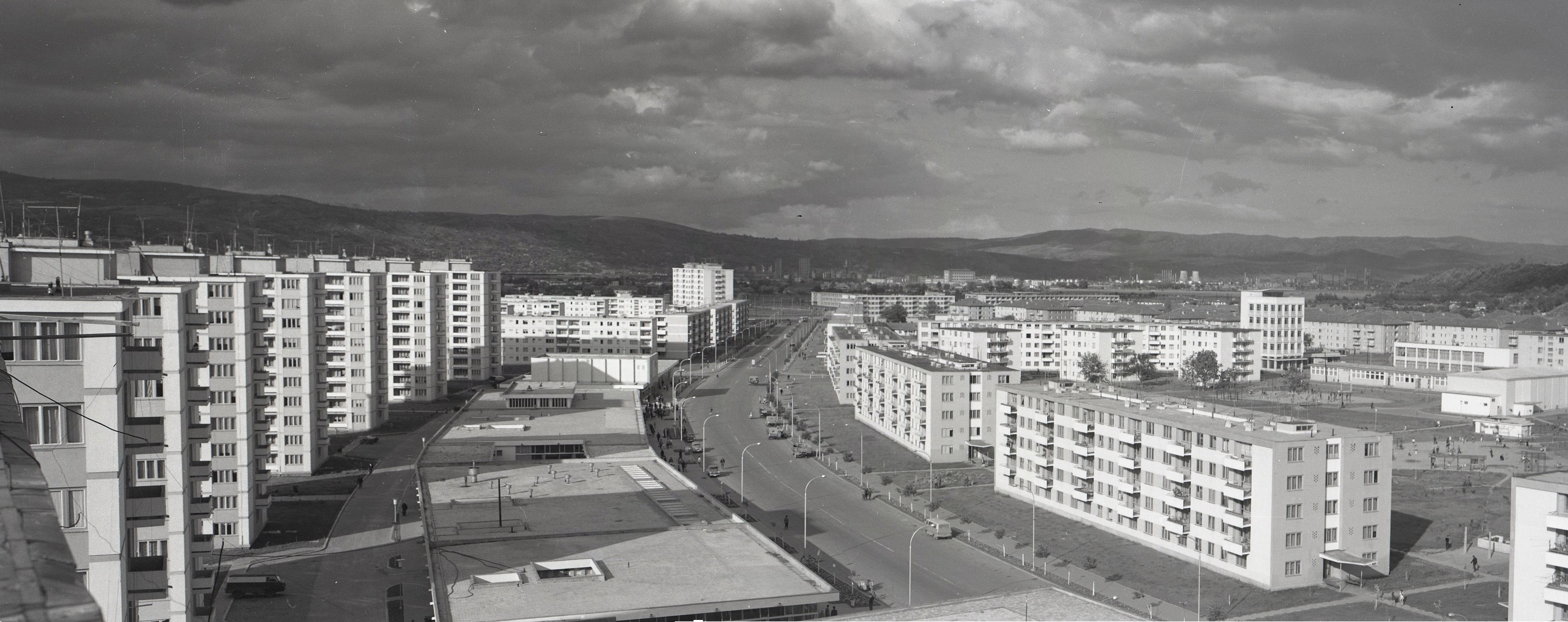
Panorama of Onești, 1965. Multiple new towns, such as this one, were mainly built near old small villages in Romania.

=== Serbia ===
Novi Beograd, meaning New Belgrade in Serbian, is a municipality of the city of Belgrade, built on a previously undeveloped area on the left bank of the Sava river. The first development began in 1947, the municipality has since expanded significantly and become the fastest developing region in Serbia.

Drvengrad, meaning Wooden Town in Serbian, is a traditional village that the Serbian film director Emir Kusturica had built for his film Life Is a Miracle. It is located in the Zlatibor District near the city of Užice, two hundred kilometers southwest of Serbia's capital, Belgrade. It is located near Mokra Gora and Višegrad.

=== Slovakia ===
- Partizánske was established in 1938–1939, when Jan Antonín Baťa of Zlín, Czechoslovakia (now Czech Republic) and his powerful network of companies built a shoe factory in the cadastral area of Šimonovany municipality. The newly created settlement for workers carried the name of Baťovany and was part of Šimonovany. With the growth of the factory, so grew the settlement. The whole municipality was renamed to Baťovany in 1948 and given town status. As a sign of recognition of local inhabitants fighting in the Slovak National uprising, the town was renamed Partizánske on 9 February 1949.
- Svit was established in 1934 by business industrialist Jan Antonín Baťa of Zlín, Czechoslovakia (now Czech Republic) in accordance with his policy of setting up villages around the country for his workers.
- Nová Dubnica is the town planned by architect Jiří Kroha, according to his concept of the ideal town. The construction of the town started in 1951, and while only one third of the original project was finished, the town center still remains one of the prime examples of Stalinist architecture in Slovakia.

=== Slovenia ===
Nova Gorica, built after 1947 immediately to the east of the new border with Italy, in which the town of Gorizia remained.

=== Spain ===
During the 16th and 17th centuries, the population of Spain declined due to emigration to the Americas and later kings and governments made efforts to repopulate the country. In the second half of the 18th century, King Charles III implemented the so-called New Settlements (Nuevas Poblaciones) plan which would bring 10,000 immigrants from central Europe to the region of Sierra Morena. Pablo de Olavide was appointed superintendent and about forty new settlements were established of which the most notable was La Carolina, which has a perfectly rectangular grid design.

Later kings and repopulation efforts led to the creation of more settlements, also with rectangular grid plans. One of them was the town of La Isabela (40.4295 N, 2.6876 W), which disappeared in the 1950s submerged under the waters of the newly created artificial lake of Buendía but is still visible just under the water in satellite imagery.

Under Francisco Franco, the Instituto Nacional de Colonización (National Institute of Colonization) built a great number of towns and villages.

Tres Cantos, near Madrid, is a good example of a successful new town design in Spain. It was built in the 1970s.

Newer additional sections of large cities are often newly planned as is the case of the Salamanca district or Ciudad Lineal in Madrid or the Eixample in Barcelona.

=== Sweden ===
Gothenburg was planned and built as a major fortified city from nothing from 1621.

Karlskrona was also planned and built as a major city and naval base from nothing, beginning 1680.

Vällingby, a suburb, is an example of a new town in Sweden from after 1950.

Kiruna was built because of the large mine, from 1898.

Arvika was also a planned city, in 1811.

Most old planned cities have grown far outside the original planned areas. The new areas were usually (but not always) also planned, but later and separately. Majorna is a near suburb of Gothenburg that was not planned, but grew more ad-hoc, with irregular curvy streets following the topography.

=== Ukraine ===
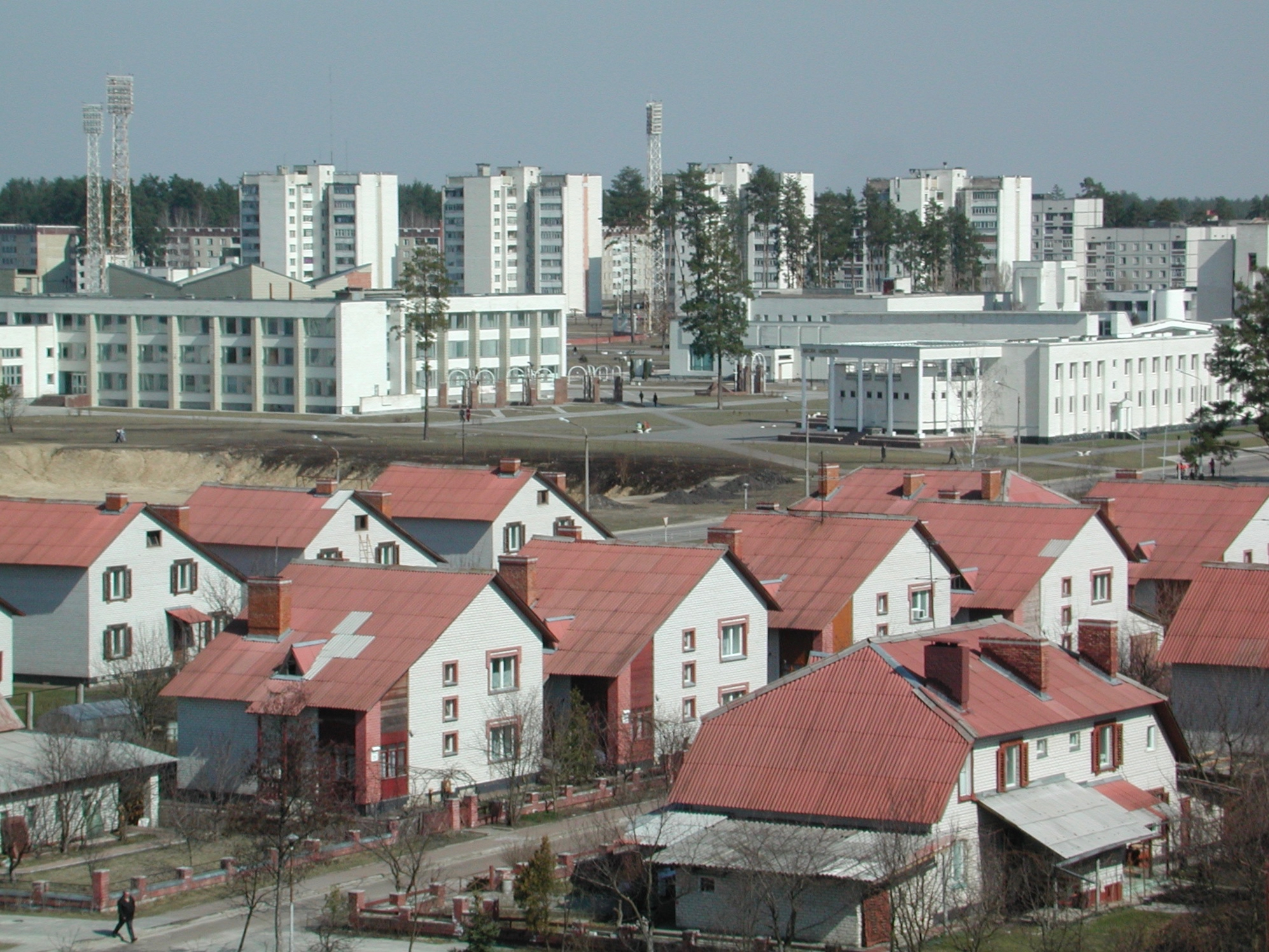
An areal photo shot of the Slavutych city (built after the Chernobyl disaster) for nuclear scientists

Odesa was built as a planned city according to 18th-century plans by the Flemish engineer Franz de Wollant (also known as François Sainte de Wollant). The same engineer also planned the following municipalities in Ukraine in the late 18th century:

- Voznesensk (Ukrainian: Вознесенськ), in Mykolayiv Oblast
- Ovidiopol (Ukrainian: Овідіополь), in Odesa Oblast

During its Soviet period, there were number of projects carry out in Ukraine as part of the All-Union urban development programs. In 1920s-1930s cities throughout the Soviet Union were "redeveloped" and had new neighborhoods created known as "Sots-gorodok" or "Sots-misto". After the World War II that program was discontinued, but number of cities still have some of their neighborhoods named after that program. Some city neighborhoods were developed as hubs for science development and were named as Akademgorodok which could be traced among many cities of the former Soviet Union. There also were built special cities like "Atomgrad" (cities of nuclear scientists), "Goroda Energetikov" (cities of power installers), city-satellites of hydropower plants, etc. (Teplodar, Enerhodar, Pivdennoukrainsk, Svitlodarsk, Svitlovodsk and many others).

Horishni Plavni, founded in the 1960 as Komsomolsk, is the most prosperous planned city in Ukraine, depending on the internationally important iron ore mining business. The city was built by method of "community effort" (Soviet Union unpaid labor) and Komsomol activism.

Prypiat is another new city in Ukraine built in 1970. The city was abandoned on 27 April 1986 after the Chernobyl nuclear disaster. On 26 April the city had 50,000 habitants, the majority working at the Chernobyl nuclear power plant. Now the abandoned town is highly contaminated by radiation. Most of the Prypiat's former inhabitants were resettled to Slavutych which was planned and built for that purpose.

=== United Kingdom ===
The Romans planned many towns in Britain, but the settlements were changed out of all recognition in subsequent centuries. The town of Winchelsea is said to be the first post-Roman new town in Britain, constructed to a grid system under the instructions of Edward I in 1280, and largely completed by 1292. Another claimant to the title is Salisbury, established in the early 13th century by the Bishop of Sarum. The best known pre-20th-century new town in the UK was undoubtedly the Edinburgh New Town, built in accordance with a 1766 master plan by James Craig, and (along with Bath and Dublin) the archetype of the Georgian style of British architecture.

==== England ====
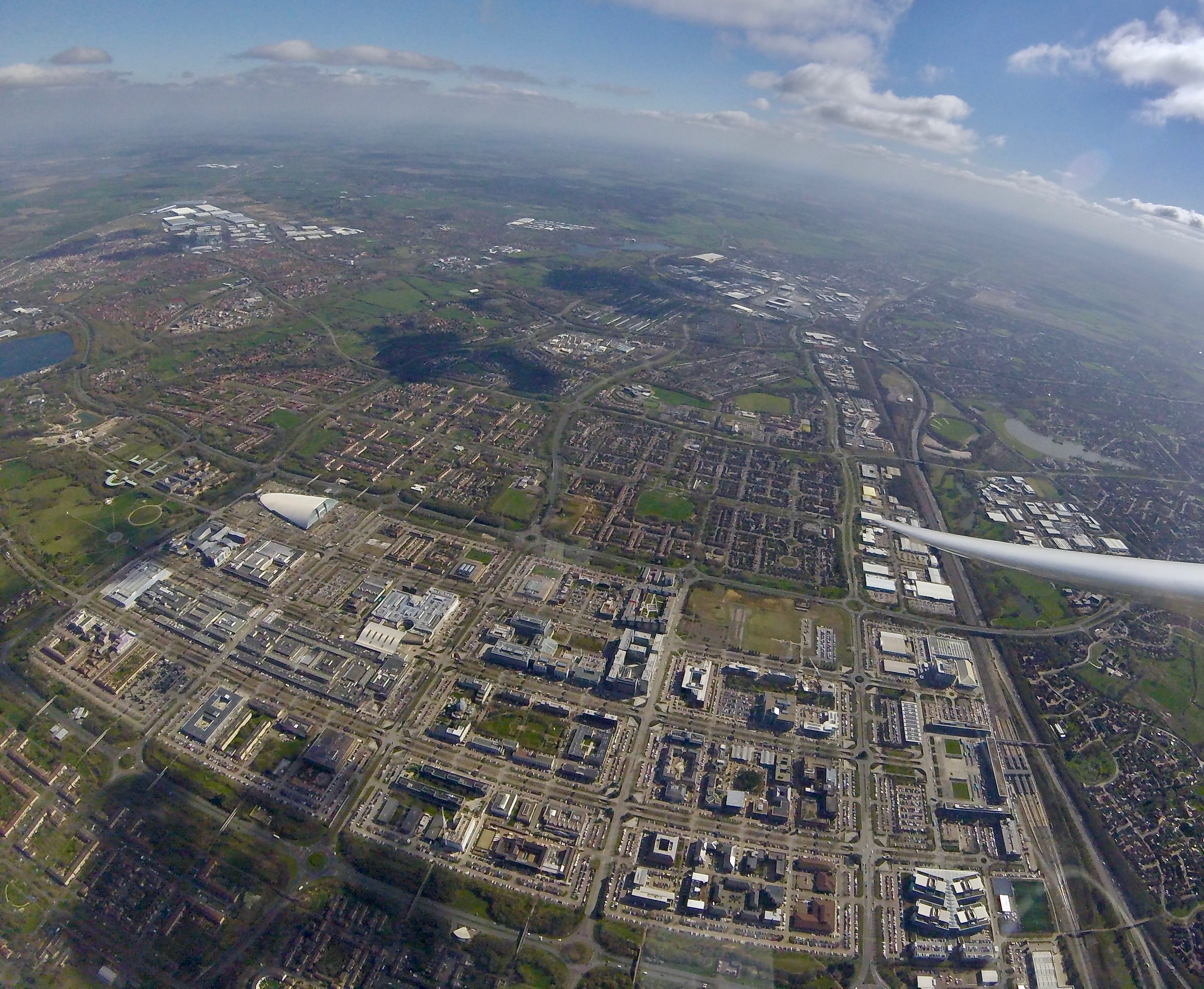
Central Milton Keynes, the central business district of Milton Keynes, the largest of the post-war "new towns".

The term "new town" often refers in the UK to towns built after World War II under the New Towns Acts. These were influenced by the garden city movement, launched around 1900 by Ebenezer Howard and Sir Patrick Geddes and the work of Raymond Unwin, and manifested at Letchworth Garden City and Welwyn Garden City in Hertfordshire.

Following World War II, some 17 projected new towns were designated under the New Towns Act 1946 (9 & 10 Geo. 6. c. 68), (Note: There are more than 17 New Towns in total, but the remainder were designated under the 1965 and later Acts. See New Towns Acts#England for the complete list.) and were developed partly to house the large numbers of people whose homes had been destroyed by the Luftwaffe during WW2 and partly to move parts of the population out of (mainly Victorian) urban slums. New Towns policy was also informed by a series of wartime commissions, including:

- the Barlow Commission (1940) into the distribution of industrial population,
- the Scott Committee into rural land use (1941)
- the Uthwatt Committee into compensation and betterment (1942)
- (later) the Reith Report into New Towns (1947).

Also crucial to thinking was the Abercrombie Plan for London (1944), which envisaged moving a million and a half people from London to new and expanded towns. (A similar plan was developed for the Clyde Valley in 1946 to combat similar problems faced in Glasgow.) Together these committees reflected a strong consensus to halt the uncontrolled sprawl of London and other large cities. For some, this consensus was tied up with a concern for social welfare reform (typified by the Beveridge Report), as typified in the motto if we can build better, we can live better; for others, such as John Betjeman it was a more conservative objection to the changing character of existing towns.

Following the building of Borehamwood, Middlesex, 12 miles north-west of central London, the first in a ring of major "first generation" New Towns around London (1946) were Stevenage, Hertfordshire, 33 miles to the north of London, and Basildon, Essex, 32 miles east of London along the River Thames. Hertfordshire built four other new towns, two in the vicinity of Stevenage (Welwyn Garden City and Hatfield), a third to the north called Letchworth, and Hemel Hempstead to the west. New Towns in the North East were also planned, such as Newton Aycliffe (which the social reformer and government adviser William Beveridge wanted to be the "ideal town to live in"), Washington, Killingworth, Billingham and Peterlee which were in both County Durham and Northumberland (except Washington and Killingworth which are now in Tyne and Wear). Bracknell in Berkshire, to the south-west of London, was designated a New Town in 1949 and is still expanding. Other London new towns from this era include Harlow in Essex and Crawley in West Sussex.

Later, a scatter of "second-generation" towns were built to meet specific problems, such as the development of the Corby Steelworks. Finally, following the New Towns Act 1965, five "third-generation" towns were launched in the late 1960s: these were larger, some of them based on substantial existing settlements such as Peterborough. Probably the most well-known was Milton Keynes – designed from the outset to be a new city (Note: In law it was a 'New Town', waiting until 2022 to be granted formal city status.) – midway between London and Birmingham, known for its grid network of distributor roads between rather than through neighbourhoods, its G2 listed central park and "covered high street" shopping centre. The 1960s saw new towns being designated around England's second-city Birmingham, namely Redditch, Tamworth and Telford.

Other towns, such as Ashford in Kent, Basingstoke in Hampshire and Swindon in Wiltshire, were designated "Expanded Towns" and share many characteristics with the new towns. Scotland also gained three more new towns: Cumbernauld in 1956, noted for its enclosed 'town centre', Livingston (1962) and Irvine (1966).

In spite of the relative success of new towns in the London Metropolitan green belt, London continued to suffer from a chronic housing shortage, especially in the south-east. Another small New Town, Thamesmead, was developed adjacent to the Thames in the early 1960s but suffered from poor transport links. Some improvement in infrastructure has been seen subsequently.

All the new towns featured a car-aware layout with many roundabouts and a grid-based road system unusual in the old world. Milton Keynes in particular has a grid-based distributor road system, designed to minimise traffic in residential areas. The earlier new towns, where construction was often rushed and whose inhabitants were generally plucked out of their established communities with little ceremony, rapidly got a poor press reputation as the home of "new town blues". These issues were systematically addressed in the later towns, with the third generation towns in particular devoting substantial resources to cycle routes, public transport and community facilities, as well as employing teams of officers for social development work.

The financing of the UK new towns was creative. Land within the designated area was acquired at agricultural use value by the development corporation for each town, and infrastructure and building funds borrowed on 60-year terms from the UK Treasury. Interest on these loans was rolled up, in the expectation that the growth in land values caused by the development of the town would eventually allow the loans to be repaid in full. However, the high levels of retail price inflation experienced in the developed world in the 1970s and 1980s fed through into interest rates and frustrated this expectation, so that substantial parts of the loans had ultimately to be written off.

All New Towns designated under the New Towns Act of 1946 were serviced by a secretariat, the New Towns Association, a quango that reported to the New Towns Directorate of the Department of the Environment. It coordinated the work of the General Managers and technical officers, published a monthly information bulletin and provided information for visitors from around the world. As each New Town reached maturity, the town's assets were taken over by the Commission for New Towns. Set up in 1948, the New Towns Association was dissolved in 1998. All papers held by it and the Commission for New Towns are held in The National archives:

From the 1970s the first generation towns began to reach their initial growth targets. As they did so, their development corporations were wound up and the assets disposed of: rented housing to the local authority, and other assets to the Commission for New Towns (in England; but alternative arrangements were made in Scotland and Wales). The Thatcher Government, from 1979, saw the new towns as a socialist experiment to be discontinued, and all the development corporations were dissolved by 1992 (with the closure of Milton Keynes Development Corporation), even for the third generation towns whose growth targets were still far from being achieved. Ultimately the Commission for New Towns was also dissolved and its assets – still including a lot of undeveloped land – passed to the English Industrial Estates Corporation (later known as English Partnerships).

Many of the New Towns attempted to incorporate public art and cultural programmes but with mixed methods and results. In Harlow the architect in charge of the design of the new town, Frederick Gibberd, founded the Harlow Art Trust and used it to purchase works by leading sculptors, including Auguste Rodin, Henry Moore and Barbara Hepworth. In Peterlee the abstract artist Victor Pasmore was appointed part of the design team, which led to the building of the Apollo Pavilion. Washington New Town was provided with a community theatre and art gallery. The public art in Milton Keynes includes the Concrete Cows, which resulted from the work of an 'artist in residence' and have gone on to become a recognised landmark.

In the 1990s, an experimental "new town", developed by the Prince of Wales to use very traditional or vernacular architectural styles, was started at Poundbury in Dorset. The success of the urban planning philosophy implemented in Poundbury and later Nansledan in Cornwall has significantly influenced 21st-century town planning in England. Emphasising human-scaled "gentle density", walkable layouts, sustainable local building materials, and mixed-use public spaces designed to foster social cohesion, these communities achieved commercial success and helped shift architectural discourse towards traditional, pedestrian-focused urbanism.

In 2025, the UK government adopted many of these principles for its new wave of proposed planned towns. Moving away from the car-centric and concrete-dominated models of some post-war developments, the planning framework for the new towns incorporates strict "design codes" and gentle density models—such as terraced housing and small-parcel urban blocks instead of high-rise structures, to combine environmental sustainability with walkable community spaces.

==== Northern Ireland ====
In Northern Ireland, building of Craigavon in County Armagh commenced in 1966 between Lurgan and Portadown, although entire blocks of flats and shops lay empty, and later derelict, before eventually being bulldozed. It was intended to be the heart of a new linear city incorporating Lurgan and Portadown, but this plan was mostly abandoned and later described as having been flawed.

Derry was the first ever planned city on the island of Ireland. In 1613, Work began on building the new city across the River Foyle from the ancient town of Derry (Doire Cholm Chille or Doire). The walls were actually completed five years later in 1618. The central diamond (plaza) within a walled city with four gates was thought to be a good design for defence.

==== Scotland ====
Two "post-war new towns" were planned at East Kilbride (1947) and Glenrothes (1948), then the late 1950s and early 1960s saw the creation of Cumbernauld, Irvine and Livingston. Each of these towns is in Scotland's list of 20 most populated towns and cities. Glenrothes was the first new town in the UK to appoint a town artist in 1968. A massive range of artworks (around 132 in total) ranging from concrete hippos to bronze statues, dancing children, giant flowers, a dinosaur, a horse and chariot and crocodiles, to name but a few, were created. Town artists appointed in Glenrothes include David Harding and Malcolm Robertson.

==== Wales ====
The only new towns in Wales have been Newtown and Cwmbran. Cwmbran was established to provide new employment in the south eastern portion of the South Wales Coalfield.

== North America and the Caribbean ==
=== Canada ===
When Prime Minister John A. Macdonald began to settle the West in Canada, he put the project under the command of the Canadian Pacific Railway (CPR), which exercised complete control over the development of land under its ownership. The federal government granted every second square mile section (totalling 101,000 km^{2}) along the proposed route to the railway. The railway decided where to place the stations, and thus decided where the dominant town of the area would be. In most instances they built stations on empty sections of land to make the largest profit from land sales – meaning that the CPR founded many towns in western Canada, such as Medicine Hat and Moose Jaw, from scratch. If an existing town was close to the newly constructed station but on land not owned by the railway, the town was forced to move itself to the new site and reconstruct itself, essentially building a new town. Calgary, Alberta and Yorkton, Saskatchewan, were among the towns that had to move themselves.

After the CPR established a station at a particular site, it planned how the town would be constructed. The side of the tracks with the station would go to business, while the other side would go to warehouses. Furthermore, the railway controlled where major buildings went (by giving the town free land to build where they wanted things to go), the construction of roads and the placement and organization of class-structured residential areas.

The CPR's influence over the development of the Canadian west's communities was one of the earliest examples of new town construction in the modern world. Later influences on planned community development in Canada were the exploitation of mineral and forest wealth, usually in remote locations of the vast country. Among numerous company towns planned and built for these purposes were Corner Brook and Grand Falls in Newfoundland, Témiscaming and Fermont in Quebec.

In the modern suburban context, several "New Towns" were established in the suburbs of large cities. Early examples include Leaside in Toronto and Mount Royal in Montreal. Both were planned and developed by the Canadian Northern Railway as middle class suburbs, though both, Leaside in particular, featured large industrial tracts. Leaside had its own municipal government until 1967, while Mount Royal continues to enjoy autonomy from the City of Montreal.

In the post-war period, new corporate new towns were developed. Bramalea, located in Brampton, Ontario and Erin Mills, located in Mississauga, Ontario, were both developed in phases. Both included residential, commercial and industrial components. Development in Erin Mills continues to this day.

More recently, the Cornell development in Markham, Ontario, was built as a new town, using the concepts of New Urbanism. CityPlace in Toronto is another example of a planned community.

=== Mexico ===
Tenochtitlan was the capital of the Aztec empire, which was built on an island in Lake Texcoco in what is now the Federal District in central Mexico. The city was largely destroyed in the 1520s by Spanish conquistadores. Mexico City was erected on top of the ruins and, over the ensuing centuries, most of Lake Texcoco has gradually been drained.

Puebla was built because of the need of a Spanish settlement in the route between Mexico City and the port of Veracruz.

Cancún in the state of Quintana Roo is a planned city, considered a tourism destination of global scale. It was transformed from old-growth forest to a well known Mexican destination.

=== United States ===
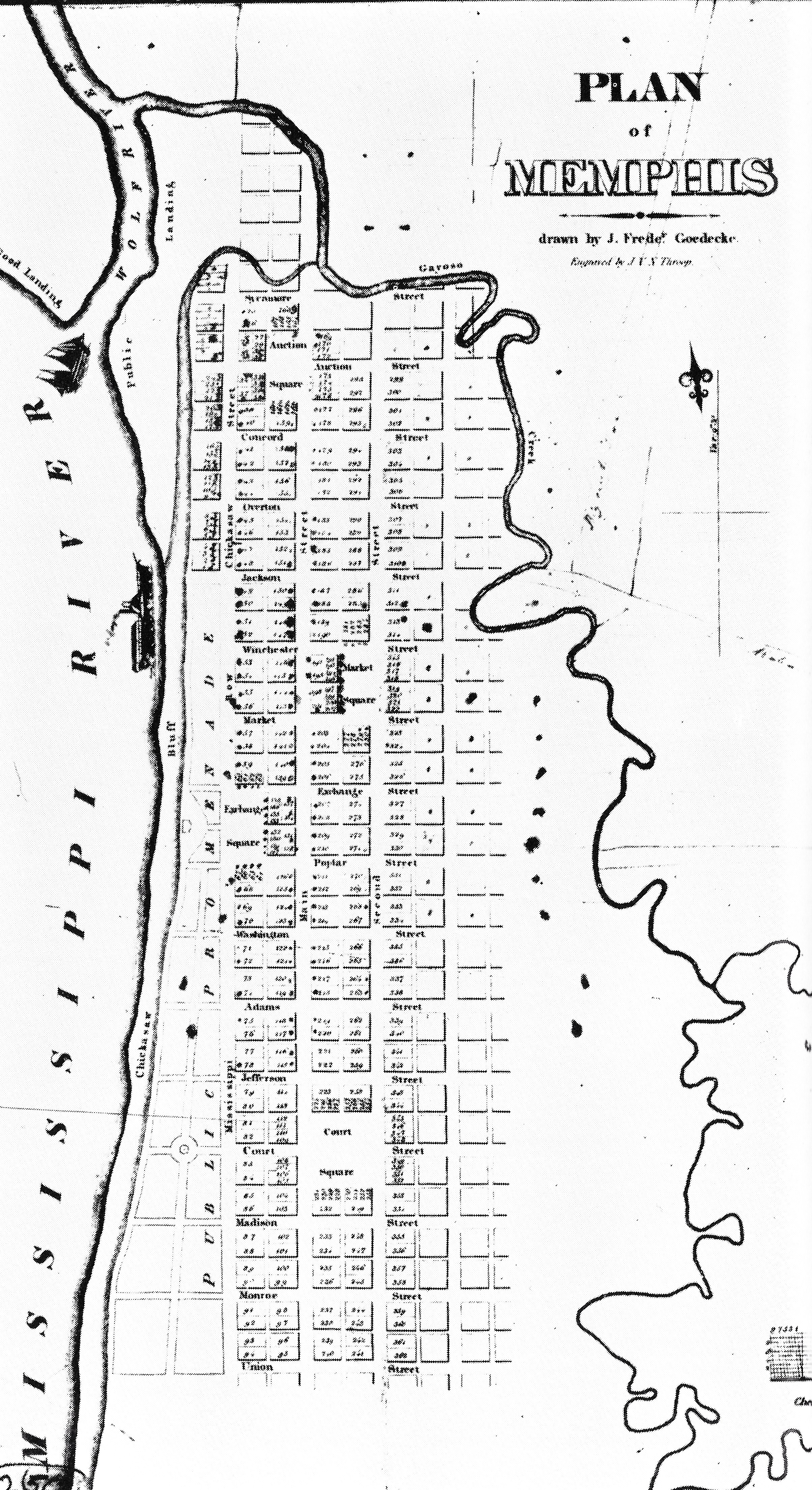
The original plan for Memphis, Tennessee, as surveyed in 1819

==== Colonial and pre-Industrial periods ====
In the colonial history of the United States, the first planned community was St. Augustine, planned in 1565. The earliest towns in English-speaking America such as Jamestown had only rudimentary elements of planning. The first comprehensively planned town was Charles Town (later Charleston, South Carolina), which was founded in 1670, planned in 1672, and relocated in 1680. Later planned cities included Philadelphia, 1682; Albany, 1695; Williamsburg, 1699; Annapolis, 1718; New York City 1731 (redesigned by the British); Savannah, 1733; New Haven, 1748 (with an early plan dated 1638); and Alexandria, 1749. The national capital (Washington, D.C.), and several state capitals (Jackson, Mississippi; Columbus, Ohio; Indianapolis, Indiana; Raleigh, North Carolina; Columbia, South Carolina; Madison, Wisconsin; Salt Lake City, Utah; Tallahassee, Florida; and Austin, Texas) were essentially carved out of the wilderness to serve as capital cities.

The Harmony Society created socialist utopian religious communities in Harmony, Pennsylvania (1804), New Harmony, Indiana (1814), and what is now Old Economy Village in Pennsylvania (1824). Radical Pietists founded a community at Zoar, Ohio in 1817, which was active until 1898. The Amana Colonies laid out seven villages in central Iowa, starting in 1855. They remain today substantially unchanged.

==== Industrial Revolution era ====
During the early- to mid-19th century, after the success of Slater's Mill and mills at Waltham, Massachusetts, wealthy investors such as the Boston Associates bought land on rivers, built dams and textile mills, and created mill towns including Lowell, Lawrence, and Holyoke, Massachusetts.

Pullman, now incorporated into Chicago's South Side, was a world-renowned company town founded by the industrialist George M. Pullman in the 1880s.

Venice of America, a California City opened in 1904, founded by Abbot Kinney who saw a swamp like area wetland of land in Los Angeles County as an opportunity to create a visitor destination on the shores of the Pacific Ocean. The entire city was laid out to conform to the contours of natural water runoff which allowed him to dredge mud from the low-lying areas thereby forming canals and with the dirt that was removed in the process, along the sides of the canals raise the elevation high enough to create housing pads.

In Beaver County, Pennsylvania, near Pittsburgh, American Bridge Company founded Ambridge, Pennsylvania in 1905 as a company town for American Bridge; American Bridge is still based near Ambridge today in nearby Coraopolis, Pennsylvania. The American Viscose Corporation built at least two residential neighborhoods for their workers, one in Marcus Hook, Pennsylvania around 1910 and one near Lewistown, Pennsylvania called Juniata Terrace, in 1920. The latter was placed on the National Register of Historic Places in 2024.

Another well-known company town is Gary, Indiana, which was founded in 1906 by the United States Steel Corporation as a home for its new steel mill, the Gary Works, and named after Elbert Henry Gary, the chairman of the company. For many years the Gary Works was the largest steel mill in the world, and it dominated the town, the main entrance being at the northern end of Broadway, the city's main thoroughfare. The fortunes of this planned city have historically risen and fallen with those of the steel mill: prosperous in the 1930s, the city has lost 55 percent of its population since 1960.

Riverside, Illinois, Radburn, New Jersey, and Kansas City, Missouri's Country Club District are other early examples of planned communities. Riverside is arguably the first planned suburb (as opposed to a stand-alone entity) in the United States, designed in 1869 by Calvert Vaux and Frederick Law Olmsted. The village was incorporated in 1875. Established in 1912, Shaker Heights, Ohio, was planned and developed by the Van Sweringen brothers, railroad moguls who envisioned the community as a suburban retreat from the industrial inner-city of Cleveland. Kohler Company created a planned village of the same name west of the company's former headquarters city of Sheboygan, Wisconsin, which incorporated in 1912. In 1918, the Aluminum Company of America built the town of Alcoa, Tennessee for the employees of the nearby aluminum processing plant. Mariemont, Ohio is a town financed in the 1920s by philanthropist Mary Emery, designed as a place for both single-family homes and affordable apartments outside of the inner city.

The Stelton Colony in New Jersey was established as an anarchist community.

==== Government-led schemes ====
During the Florida land boom of the 1920s in South Florida, the communities of Coral Gables, Opa-locka, and Miami Springs, now suburbs of Miami, were incorporated as fully planned "themed" communities which were to reflect the architecture and look of Spain, Arabia, and Mexico respectively, and are now considered some of the first modern planned communities in the United States. Oldsmar, located in west central Florida, was developed by automobile pioneer Ransom E. Olds.

In 1928, San Clemente, California was incorporated by Ole Hanson who designated that all buildings must be approved by an architectural review board to retain control over development and building style.

During the Great Depression of the 1930s, several model towns were planned and built by the Federal government. Arthurdale, Eleanor, and Tygart Valley, West Virginia, federally funded New Deal communities, were Eleanor Roosevelt's projects to ease the burden of the depression on coal miners. The Tennessee Valley Authority created several towns of its own to accommodate workers constructing their new dams; the most prominent being Norris, Tennessee. Three "Greenbelt Communities", Greenbelt, Maryland, Greenhills, Ohio, and Greendale, Wisconsin, built by the Federal government during the 1930s were planned with a surrounding "belt" of woodland and natural landscaping. Government policy prevented initial settlement by African-Americans in these communities.

During World War II, the Manhattan Project built several planned communities to provide accommodations for scientists, engineers, industrial workers and their families. These communities, including Oak Ridge, Tennessee, Richland, Washington and Los Alamos, New Mexico were necessary because the laboratories and industrial plants of the Manhattan Project were built in isolated locations to ensure secrecy. Even the existence of these towns was a military secret, and the towns themselves were closed to the public until after the war.

==== Postwar period ====
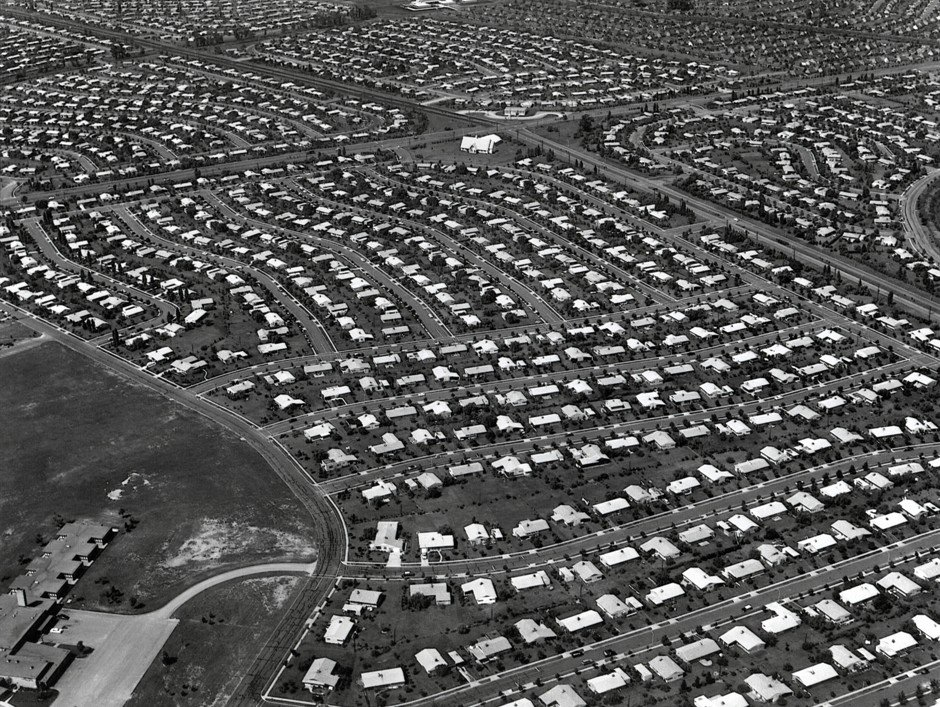
Aerial view of Levittown, Pennsylvania c. 1959

The Levittowns—in Long Island, Pennsylvania and New Jersey (now known as Willingboro, New Jersey) – typified the planned suburban communities of the 1950s and early 1960s. California's Rohnert Park (north of San Francisco) is another example of a planned city (built at the same time as Levittown) that was marketed to attract middle-class people into an area only populated with farmers with the phrase, "A Country Club for the middle class". Concord Park, Pennsylvania, established in 1954, was intended to be a model racially integrated community, though to accommodate discriminatory attitudes among financiers, the fraction of African-American households was capped at 45%. Parts of Lexington, Massachusetts (Six Moon Hill, Five Fields, Peacock Farm, and Turning Mill / Middle Ridge) were developed along different philosophical linkes, with mid-century modern architecture and semi-communal property, in stages from 1947 to 1967.

==== Modern planned cities ====
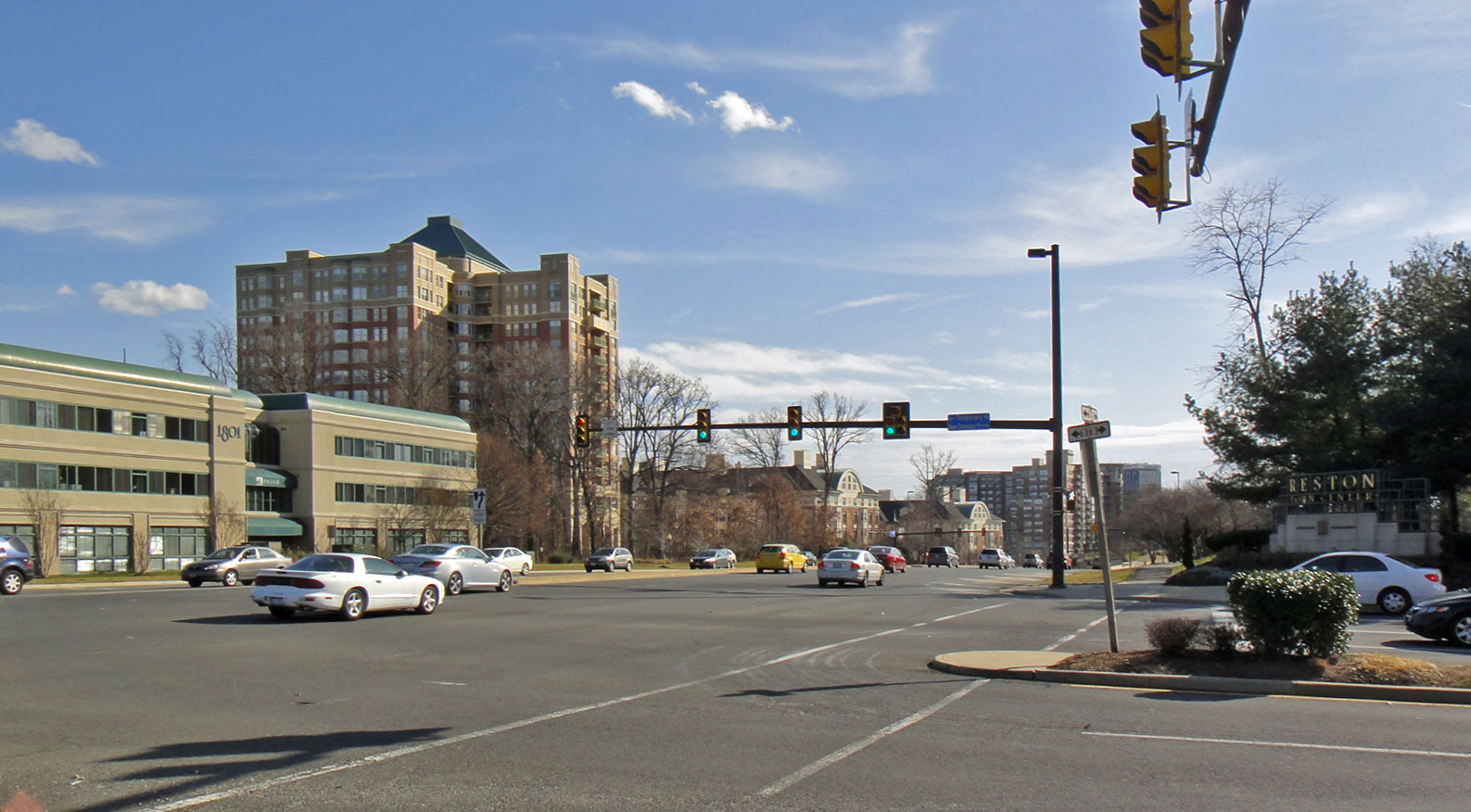
Reston, Virginia

The era of the modern planned city began in 1962–1964 with the creation of Reston, Virginia, followed a year later by Coral Springs, Florida, and Columbia, Maryland. In more recent years, New Urbanism has set the stage for new cities, with places like Seaside, Florida, and Celebration, Florida, developed by The Walt Disney Company.

In the United States, suburban growth in the Sunbelt states has coincided with the popularity of Master Planned Communities within established suburbs. In 1970, Jonathan, Minnesota became the first new town in the United States to receive a guarantee of financial assistance from federal government as part of Title IV of the Housing and Urban Development act of 1968; this community folded in 1979, though remnants of the planned community are still visible today. Las Colinas, established in 1973, was another early example and is still growing. Las Colinas is a 12,000 acres (4,900 ha) master planned community within the Dallas-area city of Irving. In 2006, residents approved changes to deed restrictions to allow greater density of urban mixed-use and residential construction. Also in the 1970s, just north of the existing town of Spring, Texas (north of Houston), oil and gas industry executive George P. Mitchell developed The Woodlands, a large residential and commercial master planned community in the Houston area. In the 1990s, Cinco Ranch was first developed just south of the existing town of Katy, one of the western suburbs of Houston, and has contributed to the explosive recent growth of Houston's suburban west side.

In the San Francisco Bay Area, master planned commercial developments such as Bishop Ranch in San Ramon and Hacienda Business Park in Pleasanton have attracted major corporate tenants to relocate from downtown Oakland and San Francisco; these companies include Safeway, Chevron Corporation and AT&T (as the former Pacific Bell).

Towns such as Mountain House, California, added an additional wrinkle to the movement: to prevent conurbation with nearby cities, they have imposed strict growth boundaries, as well as automatic "circuit breakers" that place moratoriums on residential development if the number of jobs per resident in the town falls below a certain value. Coyote Springs, Nevada, Destiny, Florida and Douglas Ranch in Buckeye, Arizona are amongst the largest communities being planned for the 21st century. The town of Ave Maria, Florida, founded in 2007, is anchored by Ave Maria University, a private Catholic university, and a Catholic church in the center of town surrounded by commercial and residential development.

Although the Walt Disney Company divested its interest in Celebration, Florida, in March 2022, the company selected Rancho Mirage, California as the location of its first mixed-use Storyliving by Disney community. Named Cotino, the community is being developed in collaboration with DMB Development of Scottsdale, Arizona.

== South and Central America ==
=== Colonial cities in Spanish and Portuguese administration ===
The colonial city was the basic administrative organism of the Portuguese and Spanish viceroyalties in America.

Cities were built and organized according to the Castilian model. Streets were drawn according to a perpendicular layout and in the center was the "Plaza de Armas", where the local and religious authorities were. Cities can be divided into several categories: administration centers, international ports, regional ports, mining centers, indigenous centers, agricultural centers, presidios, border military centers or religious centers (missions).

Cities, of course, grew and transformed over time. The only example of the original layout of a city from the first decades of the conquest can be seen in the ruins of León Viejo, next to Lake Managua, in Nicaragua. The city was abandoned and moved to its current location before the end of the 16th century.

=== Argentina ===
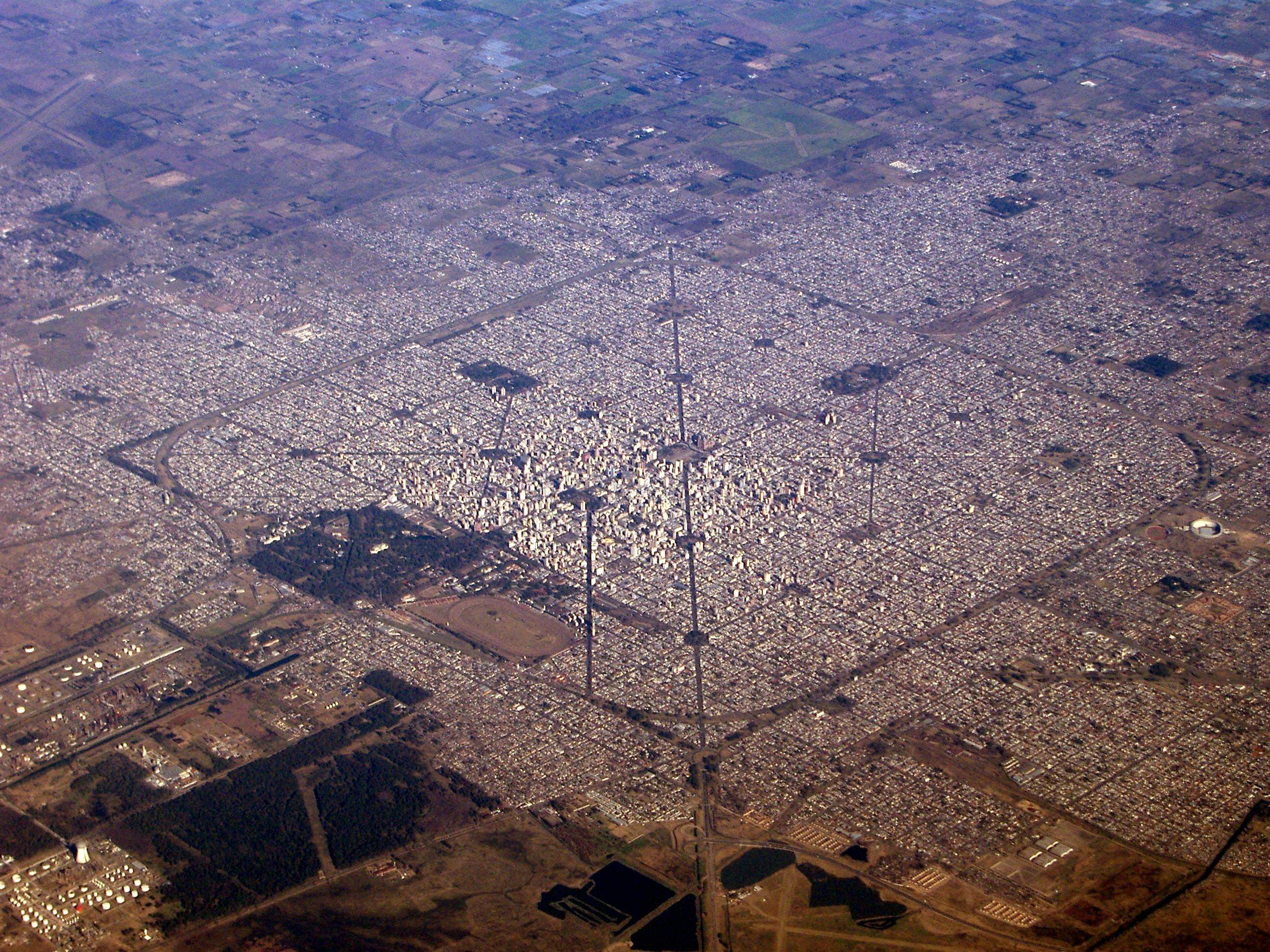
La Plata from the air

La Plata was planned in 1880 to replace Buenos Aires city as the capital of the Buenos Aires Province.

Urban planner Pedro Benoit designed a city layout based on a rationalist conception of urban centers. The city has the shape of a square with a central park and two main diagonal avenues, north–south and east–west. (In addition, there are numerous other shorter diagonals.) This design is copied in a self-similar manner in small blocks of six by six blocks in length. Every six blocks, one finds a small park or square. Other than the diagonals, all streets are on a rectangular grid, and are numbered consecutively.

The designs for the government buildings were chosen in an international architectural competition. Thus, the Governor Palace was designed by Italians, City Hall by Germans, etc. Electric street lighting was installed in 1884, and was the first of its kind in Latin America.

=== Brazil ===
==== Brasília ====
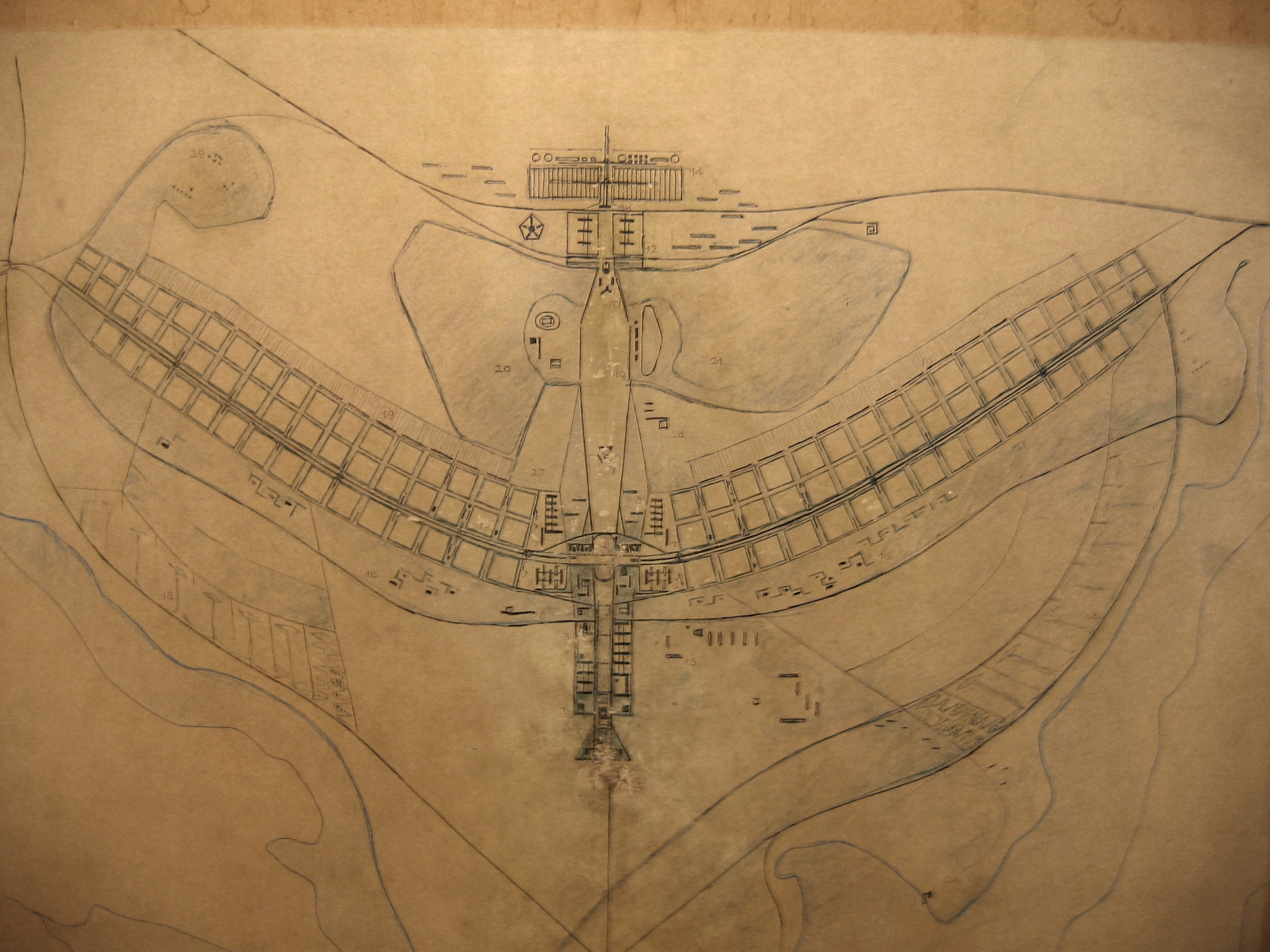
Brasília Pilot Plan by Lúcio Costa

Juscelino Kubitschek, President of Brazil from 1956 to 1961, ordered the construction of Brasília, fulfilling the promise of the Constitution and his own political campaign promise. Building Brasília was part of Juscelino's "fifty years of prosperity in five" plan. Lúcio Costa won a contest and was the main urban planner in 1957, with 5550 people competing. Oscar Niemeyer, a close friend, was the chief architect of most public buildings and Roberto Burle Marx was the landscape designer. Brasília was built in 41 months, from 1956 to 21 April 1960, when it was officially inaugurated.

The former capital of Brazil was Rio de Janeiro, and resources tended to be concentrated in the southeast region of Brazil. While the city was built because there was a need for a neutrally located federal capital, the main reason was to promote the development of Brazil's hinterland and better integrate the entire territory of Brazil. Brasília is approximately at the geographical center of Brazilian territory.

Lúcio Costa, the city's principal architect, designed the city to be shaped like an airplane. Housing and offices are situated on giant superblocks, everything following the original plan. The plan specifies which zones are residential, which zones are commercial, where industries can settle, where official buildings can be built, the maximum height of buildings, etc.

==== Belo Horizonte ====
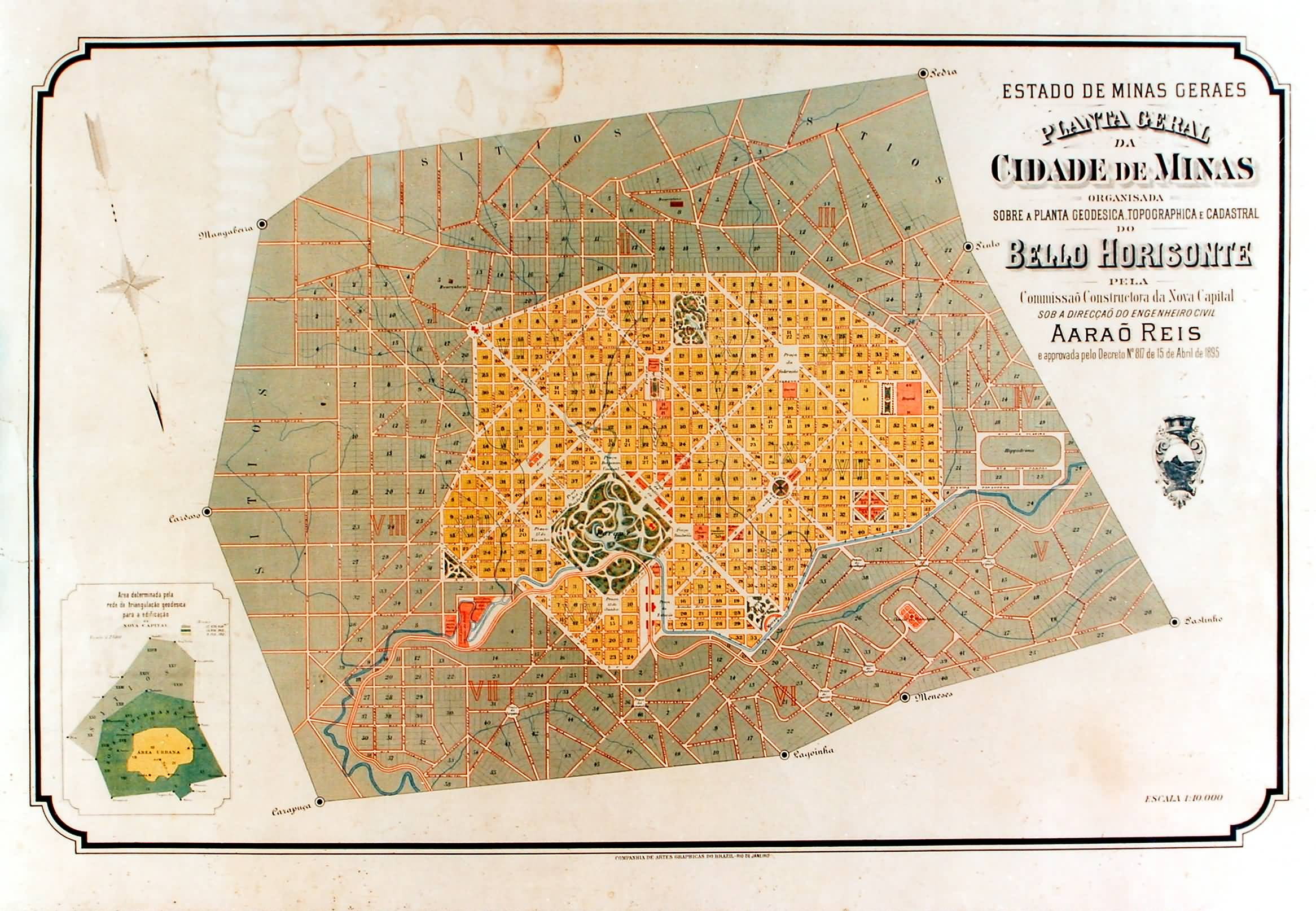
Belo Horizonte in 1895

In 1889, Brazil became a republic, and it was agreed that a new state capital of Minas Gerais, in tune with a modern and prosperous Minas Gerais, had to be set. In 1893, due to the climatic and topographic conditions, Curral Del Rey was selected by Minas Gerais governor Afonso Pena among other cities as the location for the new economical and cultural center of the state, under the new name of "Cidade de Minas", or City of Minas. Aarão Reis, an urbanist from the State of Pará, was then set to design the second planned city of Brazil (the first one is Teresina), and then Cidade de Minas was inaugurated finally in 1897, with many unfinished constructions as the Brazilian Government set a deadline for its completion. Inhabitation of the city was subsidized by the local government, through the concession of free empty lots and funding for building houses. An interesting feature of Reis' downtown street plan for Belo Horizonte was the inclusion of a symmetrical array of perpendicular and diagonal streets named after Brazilian states and Brazilian indigenous tribes.

==== Goiânia ====
The plan was for a city of 50,000 with the shape of a concentric radius – streets in the form of a spoke, with the Praça Cívica as the center, with the seats of the state and municipal government – The Palace of Emeralds and the Palace of Campinas. In 1937, a decree was signed transferring the state capital from the Cidade de Goiás to Goiânia. The official inauguration only occurred in 1942 with the presence of the president of the republic, governors, and ministers.

==== Other ====
Fordlândia was built to be a part of Henry Ford's motor company. Originally intended to be a rubber plantation, it failed within several years and is now home to squatting farmers.

Other notable planned cities in Brazil include Teresina (The first one, inaugurated in 1842), Petrópolis, Boa Vista, Palmas, Londrina, and Maringá (the latter two in the state of Paraná).

=== Chile ===
While cities such as Santiago, La Serena or Concepción were planned and built in the Conquista period (16th century), it was in the 18th century when authorities promoted the founding of cities through the Population Office ("Junta de Poblaciones del Reino de Chile"), establishing new planned cities such as Rancagua, Talca or Chillán. After Independence, more planned cities were founded to expedite the consolidation of national sovereignty in remote places, such as Puerto Montt, Punta Arenas and Temuco. In the 20th century onwards there were a few cases, like Coyhaique, though until the 1930s there were private planned communities for mining workers called oficinas, such as Sewell or María Elena.

=== Panama ===
Although Panama City itself is not planned, certain areas are such as Costa del Este, an exclusive high density residential and business area, very close to downtown Panama City. The project combines many skyscrapers with beautiful green areas, and it is close to a highway that connects it to the city center. Other planned areas, but in a lesser degree, are Punta Pacifica and the former Canal Zone.

=== Venezuela ===
- Guayana City – Bolívar State

Guyana City is a city in Bolívar State, Venezuela. It lies south of the Orinoco, where the river is joined by the Caroní River. The city, officially founded in 1961, is actually composed of the old town of San Félix at the east and the new town of Puerto Ordaz to the west, which lies on the confluence of the Caroní and Orinoco Rivers and is the site of the Llovizna Falls. There are bridges across the Caroni and a new bridge across the Orinoco (Second Orinoco crossing). The city stretches 40 kilometers along the south bank of the Orinoco. With approximately one million people, it is Venezuela's fastest-growing city due to its important iron and steelworks and aluminium industries. The city has a large hydroelectric power plant, Macagua Dam. Guayana City is one of Venezuela's five most important ports, since most goods produced in Bolívar are shipped through it, onto the Atlantic Ocean via the Orinoco river. Due to its planned nature, the city has a drastically different feel to it than many other South American cities. The towers of the Alta Vista district recall Barranquilla, and many of the residential neighborhoods have architecture and landscaping that are similar to suburbs in the United States in the 1950s, including 'cookie cutter' homes, sidewalks, and patterned lawns. This is an artifact due to the presence in the 1960s and early 1970s of US Steel, an American company with iron mining operations in the region. US Steel built housing for hundreds of its American expatriate workers and families, who lived in Puerto Ordaz and other communities until the nationalization of the Venezuelan steel industry forced the company and its workers to leave.

== Oceania ==
=== Australia ===
Australia's most prominent fully planned city is Canberra, its capital, designed by American architect Walter Burley Griffin. The early central areas of two state capital cities – Adelaide and Melbourne – were also planned by surveyors. Walter Burley Griffin was Australia's most notable city planner, having also designed smaller cities and towns, including Leeton and Griffith in New South Wales. A controversial Japanese-backed planned city, Multifunction Polis, was proposed in the 1980s, but never implemented.

Australia is still building planned communities with developers such as Delfin Lend Lease, an S&P/ASX 50 company, that has been responsible for large master planned communities such as;

- Forest Lake, Queensland, Brisbane (completed 2004)
- The New Rouse Hill, Sydney (current)
- Golden Grove, South Australia (Completed 1991)

==== Adelaide ====
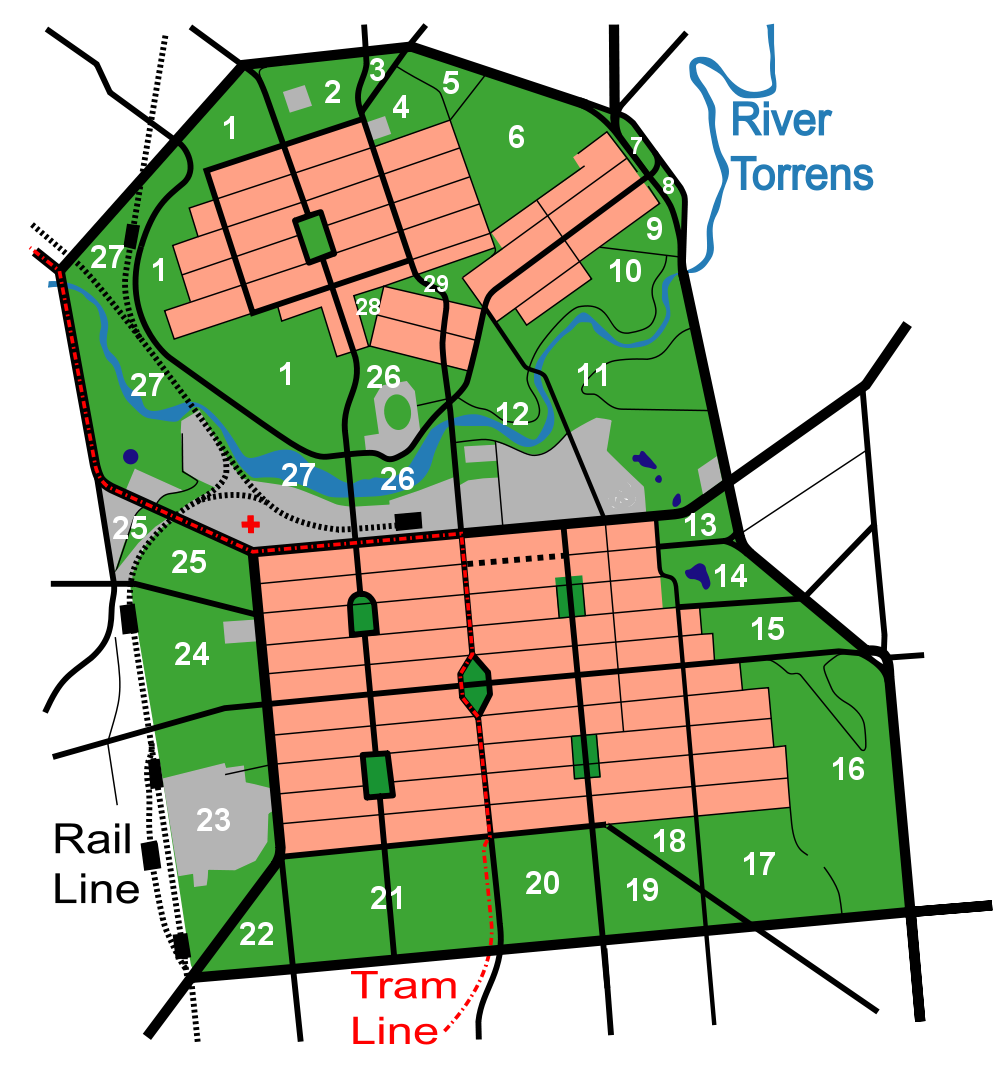
Adelaide's planned town grids were surrounded by parkland and intersected by the River Torrens.

Adelaide was founded by British and German colonists in 1836 to test out Edward Gibbon Wakefield's theories of systematic colonisation. Convict labour was not employed and the colony in theory would be financially self-sufficient; in practice, government assistance was used in the early stages. Land had been sold before any European settlers set foot in the largely unexplored territory and the city (the basis for the future central business district) was surveyed and planned in a remarkably short space of time. Adelaide's design has been praised for its four-square layout, its choice of setting and its ample parklands which have had minimal encroachment of developments. The town centre was in sufficient proximity to a water source, the River Torrens.

==== Melbourne ====
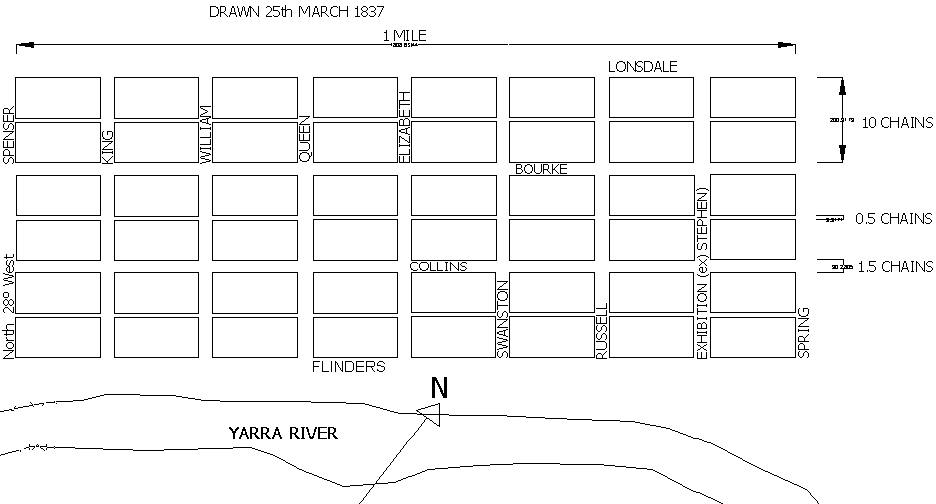
A reconstruction of Robert Hoddle's original plans for Melbourne's central grid which defined the early township and today's city centre

Melbourne was planned as a free settlement in 1837 through the Hoddle Grid, drawn up by Robert Hoddle under instructions from George Gipps, the original plan for Melbourne as part of the first land sales (prior to the planning only a handful of existing settlements were built on the fringe of the grid). The grid featured wide parallel streets, spanning a gently sloping valley between hills (Batman's Hill, Flagstaff Hill and Eastern Hill) and roughly parallel to the course of the Yarra River. The deliberate exclusion of city squares or open space within the grid was a subject of future frustration for the municipality and residents. Elizabeth Street, Melbourne, in the centre of the grid, was built over a gully and has therefore been prone to flooding. Despite a later extension and later inclusion of planned suburbs, Melbourne's original plans were not as extensive as Adelaide's, and the city rapidly outgrew its original boundaries. As such, it is often not considered to be a planned city, but the grid continues to define much of the character of the Melbourne city centre.

==== Canberra ====
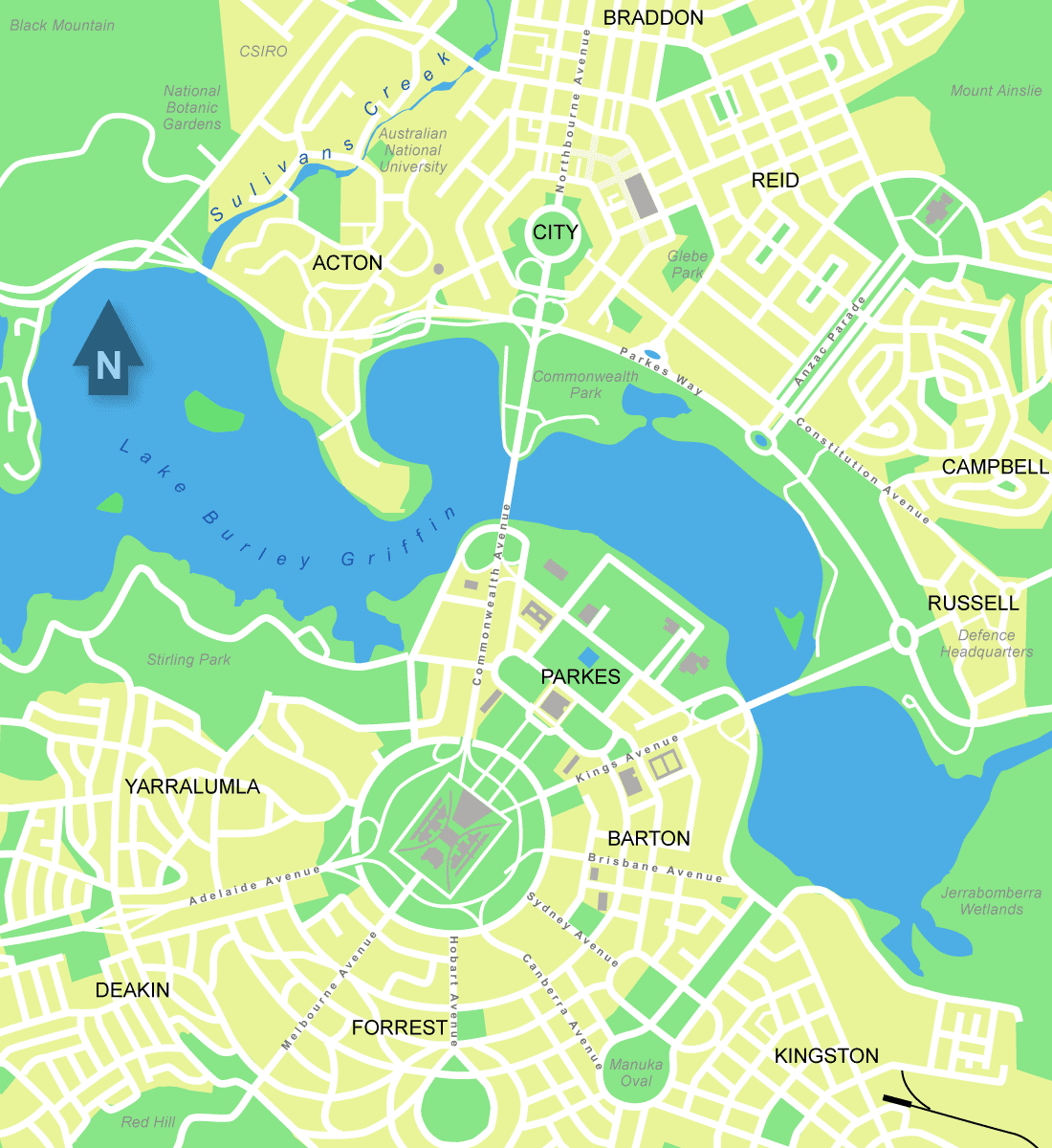
Inner Canberra demonstrates some aspects of the Griffin plan, in particular the Parliamentary Triangle.

Canberra, established in 1908, was planned as the capital city of Australia and is Australia's most notable and ambitious example of civic planning. The city was designed to be the Federal Capital following the federation of the six Australian colonies which formed the Commonwealth of Australia. The new nation required a capital that was located away from other major settlements such as Melbourne and Sydney. Canberra is thus located in a Territory – the Australian Capital Territory – and not a State. Prior to this time the land that Canberra is found on was farming land, indigenous settlements, and forest. In 1912, after an extensive planning competition was completed, the vision of American Walter Burley Griffin was chosen as the winning design for the city. Extensive construction and public works were required to complete the city, this involved the flooding of a large parcel of land to form the center piece of the city, Lake Burley Griffin. Unlike some other Australian cities, the road network, suburbs, parks and other elements of the city were designed in context with each other, rather than haphazard planning as witnessed in much of Sydney. Notable buildings include the High Court, Federal Parliament, Government House, War Memorial, Anzac Parade and headquarters of the Department of Defence.

=== New Zealand ===
New Zealand has several small new towns, built for a specific purpose. Examples include Kawerau in the Bay of Plenty (a mill town), Twizel in south Canterbury, and Mangakino in the Waikato (both for hydroelectricity). Construction of Kawerau began in 1953. Twizel was built in 1968 to house workers constructing the Upper Waitaki hydroelectric scheme and was supposed to close on their completion. However, its residents managed to save the town in 1983. Mangakino, constructed from 1946, was also meant to be a temporary construction town, but it too remains today. John Martin, the founder of the Wairarapa town of Martinborough, set out the town's first streets in the pattern of the Union Flag in the 19th century.

In 2006, construction began on Pegasus Town, a new planned town adjacent to Woodend, approximately 25 km (16 mi) north of Christchurch.

== See also ==
- Lists of purpose-built capital cities
- List of planned cities
- List of urban planners
- Arcology – Type of design principles for human habitats
- Arcosanti – Experimental town in Yavapai County, Arizona
- Colonia – Roman outpost established in conquered territory to secure it
  - Cardus – North–south street in ancient Roman cities
  - Decumanus – Main east–west street within a Roman city
- Housing estate – Group of homes and other buildings built together as a single development
- Model village – Type of mostly self-contained community
- Olympic Movement – Governing body of Olympic sports
- Principles of Intelligent Urbanism – Theory of urban planning
- Private community – Type of residential community
- Utopia – Imaginary community with desirable qualities
