= List of planned cities =

This is a list of planned cities (sometimes known as planned communities or new towns) by country. Additions to this list should be cities whose overall form (as opposed to individual neighborhoods or expansions) has been determined in large part in advance on a drawing board, or which were planned to a degree which is unusual for their time and place.

== A ==
=== Afghanistan ===
- Darulaman, Kabul

=== Argentina ===
- Ciudad Evita, Buenos Aires
- Ciudad Jardín Lomas del Palomar, Buenos Aires
- La Plata, Buenos Aires
- La Punta, San Luis
- Federación, Entre Ríos
- Totoras, Santa Fe

=== Australia ===
- Adelaide, South Australia
- Canberra, Australian Capital Territory
- Churchill, Victoria
- Eaglemont, Victoria
- Environa, New South Wales – never built
- Garden City, Victoria
- Griffith, New South Wales
- Inala, Queensland
- Springfield, Queensland
- Joondalup, Western Australia
- Karratha, Western Australia
- Leeton, New South Wales
- Melbourne central business district, Victoria
- Mildura, Victoria
- Monarto, South Australia – never built
- Multifunction Polis, South Australia – never built
- Palmerston, Northern Territory
- Yallourn, Victoria

=== Austria ===
- St. Pölten

== B ==
=== Bangladesh ===
- Dhanmondi Thana
- Gulshan Thana
- Kawran Bazar
- Mirpur Thana
- Motijheel
- Purbachal New Town – under construction
- Uttara Thana

=== Belarus ===
- Navapolatsk – plan developed in 1958
- Salihorsk – construction began in 1958

=== Belgium ===
- Charleroi
- Fort Lillo
- Leopoldsburg
- Louvain-la-Neuve
- Mariembourg
- Nieuwpoort
- Philippeville
- Scherpenheuvel

=== Belize ===
- Belmopan

=== Botswana ===
- Gaborone
- Boitumelo

=== Brazil ===
- Água Boa, Mato Grosso
- Águas de São Pedro, São Paulo
- Alta Floresta, Mato Grosso
- Apucarana, Paraná
- Aracaju, Sergipe
- Arapongas, Paraná
- Ariquemes, Rondônia
- Belmonte, Santa Catarina
- Belo Horizonte, Minas Gerais – inaugurated in 1897
- Boa Vista, Roraima
- Brasília, Distrito Federal
- Cambé, Paraná
- Cascavel, Paraná
- Cataguases, Minas Gerais – most of the town's central areas were developed according to a plan, though the rest of the town has since grown randomly
- Chapecó, Santa Catarina
- Cianorte, Paraná
- Colíder, Mato Grosso
- Curitiba, Paraná
- Erechim, Rio Grande do Sul
- Fordlândia – a dream of Henry Ford, now abandoned
- Goiânia, Goiás
- Governador Valadares, Minas Gerais (1915)
- Ilha Solteira, São Paulo
- Ipatinga, Minas Gerais
- Loanda, Paraná
- Londrina, Paraná
- Lucas do Rio Verde, Mato Grosso
- Maringá, Paraná
- Naviraí, Mato Grosso do Sul
- Nova Andradina, Mato Grosso do Sul
- Nova Londrina, Paraná
- Nova Mutum, Mato Grosso
- Palmas, Tocantins
- Paragominas, Pará
- Paranavaí, Paraná
- Petrópolis, Rio de Janeiro
- Primavera do Leste, Mato Grosso
- Rolândia, Paraná
- Salvador, Bahia
- Sinop, Mato Grosso
- Sorriso, Mato Grosso
- Tangará da Serra, Mato Grosso
- Teresina, Piauí – inaugurated in 1852 from Oeiras
- Toledo, Paraná
- Três Lagoas, Mato Grosso do Sul
- Umuarama, Paraná
- Vilhena, Rondônia

=== Bulgaria ===
- Dimitrovgrad

== C ==
=== Canada ===
It is a misconception that virtually all cities and towns in Western Canada, which were created after the federal Dominion Lands Act of 1870, (the majority of all such cities), were planned. Most of these were, indeed, railway towns, founded after surveying and planning by the powerful railway companies during construction of the Canadian Pacific Railway, Canada's first transcontinental line, or the Canadian National Railway, but this initial start generally only provided one or two streets with a few lots set out, from which the cities grew unplanned.

- Batawa, Ontario
- Bramalea, Ontario – now a part of Brampton
- Broughton, Nova Scotia – failed
- Corner Brook, Newfoundland, Newfoundland and Labrador
- Deep River, Ontario
- Don Mills, Ontario – now a part of Toronto
- Erin Mills – a planned community of Mississauga, Ontario
- Fermont, Quebec
- Gagnon, Quebec
- Grand Falls-Windsor, Newfoundland
- Grande Cache, Alberta,
- Guelph, Ontario
- Kapuskasing, Ontario
- Kitimat, British Columbia
- Mount Royal, Quebec
- New Westminster, British Columbia – designed by Richard Moody of the Royal Engineers to be the capital of the Colony of British Columbia
- Oromocto, New Brunswick
- Pinawa, Manitoba
- Thompson, Manitoba
- Townsend, Ontario – failed
- Tumbler Ridge, British Columbia
- Vaughan, Ontario

=== Chile ===
- El Salvador – mining city

=== China ===
- The Forbidden City – built to house the emperors during the Ming dynasty
- Tekes County, Ili Kazakh Autonomous Prefecture

=== Czech Republic ===
- Havířov
- Zlín
- Most
- New Town, Prague

== D – F ==
=== Denmark ===
- Esbjerg – replacing the Slesvig harbour towns lost by Denmark in the 1864 Second Schleswig War
- Fredericia – fortress town
- Herning – cultivation of Central Jutland moorland
- Nordhavn – District of Copenhagen
- Ørestad – District of Copenhagen

=== Djibouti ===
- Al Noor City – twin city to one of the same name in Yemen

=== Egypt ===
==== Modern ====
- 6th of October (city) – Giza Governorate.
- 10th of Ramadan (city) – Sharqia Governorate.
- 15th of May (city) – Cairo Governorate.
- Ain Sokhna – Suez Governorate.
- Badr – Cairo Governorate.
- El Shorouk – Cairo Governorate.
- Ismailia – Ismailia Governorate.
- Madinaty – Cairo governorate.
- The New Capital – Cairo governorate.
- New Akhmim – Sohag Governorate.
- New Aswan – Aswan Governorate.
- New Asyut – Asyut Governorate.
- New Beni Suef – Beni Suef Governorate.
- New Borg El Arab – Alexandria Governorate.
- New Cairo – Cairo Governorate.
- New Damietta – Damietta Governorate.
- New Fayum – Fayum Governorate.
- New Nubariya – Beheira Governorate.
- New Qena – Qena Governorate.
- New Salhia – Sharqia Governorate.
- New Tiba – Luxor Governorate.
- Obour (city) – Qalubyia Governorate.
- Port Fuad – Port said Governorate.
- Port Tewfik – Suez Governorate
- Ras El Bar – Damietta Governorate.
- Ras El Hekma - Matruh Governorate.
- Ras Sedr – South Sinai Governorate.
- Sharm El Sheikh – South Sinai Governorate.
- Sheikh Zayed City – Giza Governorate.

==== Under Construction ====
- The New Capital
- New Alamain
- New Ismailia
- El Galala

==== Pre Modern ====
- Memphis, Egypt – The city and capital of ancient Egypt. It was built by king Narmer around 3150 B.C.
- Akhetaten – A city built by order of the Pharaoh Akhenaten in the 14th century B.C. It was the capital of Egypt in his reign.
- Pithom – A city built by order of the Pharaoh Ramesses II in the 13th century B.C.
- Pi-Ramesses – Another city built by order of Ramesses II in the 13th century B.C. It was the capital of Egypt in his reign and it was the first city to exceed 100,000 in the history of Egypt. At its peak, the population of the city was 300,000.
- Heracleion – A city built in the 12th century B.C. The city had been a major port in ancient Egypt before it subsided below sea level.
- Alexandria – A city built by order of Alexander the Great in the 4th century B.C. It was the first city in Egypt to have a population of half million.
- Berenice Troglodytica – A city built on the Red Sea coast in the 3rd century B.C. by Ptolemy II Philadelphus.
- Fustat – A city built around 7th century CE by order of 'Amr ibn al-'As when he conquered Egypt, to be its capital
- al-Askar – the capital of Egypt during the rule of the Tulunide dynasty.
- al-Qata'i – Capital of Egypt during the Ikhshid dynasty.
- Cairo – was built in 10th century CE By the Fatimid Caliph Al Muizz.

=== Estonia ===
- Paldiski
- Võru

=== Finland ===
- Hamina
- Rovaniemi
- Tapiola, Espoo

=== France ===
- Hautepierre, a district within Strasbourg
- La Grande-Motte
- Near Lille:
  - Villeneuve d'Ascq
- Near Lyon:
  - Isle d'Abeau
- Near Marseille:
  - Aigues-Mortes
  - Fos-sur-Mer
  - Rives de l'Etang de Berre
- Neuf-Brisach, Alsace
- Near Paris:
  - Cergy-Pontoise
  - Évry
  - Marne-la-Vallée
  - Saint-Quentin en Yvelines
  - Sénart
  - Versailles
  - Le Vésinet
- Near Rouen:
  - Val-de-Reuil
- Royal Saltworks at Arc-et-Senans, Franche-Comté
- Le Touquet

== G – H ==
=== Germany ===
- Bremerhaven, Bremen
- Eisenhüttenstadt, Brandenburg
- Espelkamp, North Rhine Westphalia
- Freudenstadt, Baden-Württemberg
- Geretsried, Bavaria
- Glückstadt, Schleswig-Holstein
- Hellerau, Saxony
- Karlsruhe, Baden-Württemberg
- Ludwigslust, Mecklenburg-Vorpommern
- Mannheim, Baden-Württemberg
- Marienberg, Saxony
- Neutraubling, Bavaria
- Putbus, Mecklenburg-Vorpommern
- Salzgitter, Lower Saxony
- Bielefeld-Sennestadt, North Rhine Westphalia
- Traunreut, Bavaria
- Waldkraiburg, Bavaria
- Welthauptstadt Germania – a renewal of Berlin; never built
- Wilhelmshaven, Lower Saxony
- Wolfsburg, Lower Saxony

=== Ghana ===
- Tema

=== Greece ===
- Amaliada
- Aspra Spitia
- Aspropyrgos
- Skala town, Oropos
- Ancient Olympia
- Ermoupoli
- Rhodes beyond old town
- Nafplio
- Elefsis
- Rokkos
- Panagiouda
- Patra
- Serres
- Sparta
- Thessaloniki
- Athens-Redesigned in 1834 as the new Greek capital.
- Ioannina
- Kalamata
- Lavrio
- Nea Peramos
- Nea Makri
- Nea Moudania
- Porto Rafti
- Rafina
- Thebes
- Herakleion
- Hania
- Kalamata
- Korinthos
- Nea Fokea, Anavyssos

=== Hong Kong ===
- Fanling-Sheung Shui New Town, Fanling Town and Sheung Shui Town
- North East New Territories New Development Area
- North Lantau New Town, Tung Chung
- North West New Territories New Development Area
- Sha Tin New Town, Sha Tin Town and Ma On Shan
- Tai Po New Town, Tai Po Town
- Tin Shui Wai New Town
- Tseung Kwan O New Town
- Tsuen Wan New Town, Tsuen Wan Town and Tsing Yi Town
- Tuen Mun New Town, Tuen Mun Town
- Yuen Long New Town, Yuen Long Town

=== Hungary ===
- Dunaújváros, Fejér
- Kazincbarcika, Borsod-Abaúj-Zemplén
- Oroszlány, Komárom-Esztergom
- Petőfibánya, Heves
- Salgótarján, Nógrád
- Tatabánya, Komárom-Esztergom
- Tiszaújváros, Borsod-Abaúj-Zemplén

== I ==
=== India ===
- Andhra Pradesh
  - Amaravati
- Assam
  - Dispur
- Chandigarh
  - Chandigarh
- Chhattisgarh
  - Nava Raipur
  - Bhilai
- Delhi
  - New Delhi
  - Dwarka
- Gujarat
  - Gandhinagar
  - GIFT City
  - Dholera SIR
  - DREAM City
- Haryana
  - Gurgaon
  - Panchkula
- Jharkhand
  - Bokaro
  - Jamshedpur
- Karnataka
  - Mysore
  - Navanagar
- Maharashtra
  - Navi Mumbai (New Mumbai), a satellite city of Mumbai
  - Dhule
  - Lavasa
  - Palava City
- Mizoram
  - Thenzawl Peace City
- Nagaland
  - Nagaki Global City
- Odisha
  - Bhubaneswar
  - Rourkela
- Puducherry
  - Pondicherry
  - Auroville, Pondicherry founded in 1968
- Punjab
  - Mohali
  - Naya Nangal
- Rajasthan
  - Jaipur, the Pink City part was planned and founded in 1727 by Maharaja Jai Singh II, ruler of Jaipur State from 1699 to 1744.
  - Sri Ganganagar
- Uttar Pradesh
  - Greater Noida
  - Noida
  - Kaushambi
  - New Kanpur City
  - Trans Ganga City, Kanpur
- Uttarakhand
  - New Tehri
  - Chudchandra
- West Bengal
  - Bidhannagar, Kolkata
  - Durgapur
  - New Town, Kolkata
  - Kalyani
  - Sujalaam Skycity

=== Indonesia ===
==== Java ====
- Bandung, West Java
- Pantai Indah Kapuk, Jakarta
- Pantai Indah Kapuk Dua, Banten
- Kota Baru Parahyangan, West Java
- Alam Sutera, Banten
- Citra Raya, Banten
- Maja, Banten
- BSD City, Banten
- Kota Deltamas, West Java
- Kota Jababeka, West Java
- Kota Wisata, West Java
- Lippo Village, Banten
- Gading Serpong, Banten

==== Borneo/Kalimantan ====
- Palangkaraya, Central Kalimantan
- Tanjung Selor, North Kalimantan
- Nusantara

==== Celebes/Sulawesi ====
- Mamuju, West Sulawesi
- Sofifi, North Maluku

==== Riau Islands ====
- Batam, Riau Islands

==== Papua ====
- Kuala Kencana, Central Papua
- Tembagapura, Central Papua

=== Iran ===
- Ali Shahr
- Alavicheh
- Andisheh
- Baharestan
- Binalood
- Fuladshahr
- Hashtgerd
- Mohajeran
- Parand
- Pardis
- Ramshar
- Sadra
- Sahand
- Shahin Shahr
- Shahriar, East Azerbaijan
- Golbahar
- Shirin Shahr

Ancient planned cities

- Ardashir-Khwarrah (Gor)

=== Iraq ===
- Round city of Baghdad

=== Ireland ===
- Adamstown
- Cherrywood (under construction)
- Shannon Town, County Clare
- Tyrrelstown
- Westport

=== Israel ===
- Acre
- Afula
- Arad
- Ariel
- Ashdod
- Ashkelon
- Beersheba
- Beit She'an
- Beit Shemesh
- Caesarea
- Dimona
- Eilat
- Hatzor HaGlilit
- Karmiel
- Kiryat Gat
- Kiryat Malakhi
- Kiryat Shmona
- Ma'ale Adumim
- Ma'alot-Tarshiha
- Mitzpe Ramon
- Modi'in-Maccabim-Re'ut
- Nahariya
- Nof HaGalil
- Netivot
- Ofakim
- Or Akiva
- Safed
- Sderot
- Tiberias
- Yeruham

=== Italy ===
==== Abruzzo ====
- Salle
- San Salvo Marina

==== Basilicata ====
- Bosco Salice
- Centro Colonico Villaggio Marconi
- Policoro
- Scanzano Jonico

==== Calabria ====
- Sant'Eufemia Lamezia
- Sibari
- Thurio
- Villaggio Frasso
- Villapiana Scalo

==== Campania ====
- Borgo Appio
- Borgo Domitio
- Corvinia
- Farinia
- Licola

==== Emilia Romagna ====
- Anita
- Milano Marittima
- Tresigallo
- Volania

==== Friuli Venezia Giulia ====
- Borgo Brunner
- Fossalon
- Palmanova
- Punta Sdobba
- Torviscosa
- Lignano Sabbiadoro

==== Lazio ====
- Acilia
- Aprilia
- Guidonia
- Latina
- Maccarese
- Pomezia
- Pontinia
- Rome
- Sabaudia
- San Cesareo

==== Lombardia ====
- Milano 2
- Milano 3

==== Marche ====
- Metaurilia

==== Molise ====
- Nuova Cliternia

==== Puglia ====
- Borgo Cervaro
- Borgo Giardinetto
- Borgo Grappa
- Borgo Mezzanone
- Borgo Perrone
- Borgo Piave
- Cardigliano
- Incoronata
- Marina di Ginosa
- Montegrosso
- Porto Cesareo
- Segezia
- Siponto
- Tavernola

==== Sardinia ====
- Arborea
- Campo Giavesu
- Carbonia
- Cortoghiana
- Fertilia
- Linnas
- Pompongias
- Sassu
- Strovina
- Tanca Marchesa
- Torrevecchia
- Tramariglio
- Villaggio Calik

==== Sicily ====
- Grammichele

==== Tuscany ====
- Alberese
- Albinia
- Calambrone
- Macchiascandona
- Pienza
- Spergolaia
- Tirrenia

==== Veneto ====
- Candiana

=== Ivory Coast ===
- Yamoussoukro

== J – L ==
=== Japan ===
Planned cities

- Sapporo

All the cities in Hokkaido are planned cities.

- Ōshū, Iwate
- Historic Monuments and Sites of Hiraizumi
- Sendai/Izumi-ku, Sendai
- Tomiya, Miyagi
- Ōgata, Akita
- Tsukuba, Ibaraki
- Saitama City
  - Saitama New Urban Center
- Tokyo City – old palace Edo
  - Tama, Tokyo
  - Kunitachi, Tokyo
- Chiba, Chiba
  - Mihama-ku, Chiba
- Kamakura, Kanagawa
- Yokohama
  - Minato Mirai 21
- Sagamihara
- Nagoya
- Kōka, Shiga
  - Shigaraki Palace
- Kyoto – old palace Heian-kyō
- Nagaoka-kyō
- Kyōtanabe, Kyoto
- Kuni-kyō
- Nara – old palace Heijō-kyō
- Asuka, Yamato/Asuka-kyō
- Tenri, Nara
- Sakurai, Nara
- Kōryō, Nara
- Fujiwara-kyō
- Fukuhara-kyō
- Kibi Plateau city
- Osaka – Naniwa-kyō
- Sakai, Osaka
- Kobe
- Hiroshima
- Fukuoka City
  - Seaside Momochi
- Dazaifu, Fukuoka/Dazaifu (government)
- Naha, Okinawa
- Shuri, Okinawa

Planned University Towns, Science Cities

- Tsukuba Science City
- Kashiwanoha
- Harima Science Garden City
- Kitakyushu Science and Research Park
- Miyazaki University Town

New Town

- Near Sapporo
  - Sweden Hills
  - Eniwa New Town Megumino
- Near Tokyo
  - Jōsō New Town
  - Tsukuba Express Town
  - Musashi Ryoku-en Toshi
  - Koshigaya Lake Town
  - Kōhoku New Town
  - Tama Den-en Toshi
  - Keikyu New Town
  - Tama New Town
  - Chiba New Town
  - Makuhari Bay Town
  - Yukarigaoka
- Near Nagoya
  - Kozoji New Town
  - Tōkadai New Town
  - Nagaoka New Town
- Near Osaka
  - Senri New Town
  - Senboku New Town
  - International culture park city Saito
- Near Hiroshima
  - Seifu Shinto

=== Jordan ===
- Amra City

=== Kazakhstan ===
- Astana
- Nurkent

=== Kenya ===
- Konza Technopolis – A project for Kenya's Vision 2030

=== Kuwait ===
- Madinat al-Hareer (Silk City)
- Sabah Al Ahmad Sea City
- Al-Mutlaa

=== Lebanon ===
- Qanafar City – As a transformation project of Kherbet Qanafar

=== Lithuania ===
- Visaginas
- Elektrėnai

== M – N ==
=== Malaysia ===
- Bandar Baru Bangi, Selangor
- Bandar Tun Razak, Kuala Lumpur
- Cyberjaya, Selangor
- Iskandar Puteri, Johor – part of the Iskandar Malaysia project
- Kuala Kubu Bharu, Selangor
- Petaling Jaya, Selangor
- Putrajaya
- Penang
- Petra Jaya, Sarawak
- Shah Alam, Selangor
- Subang Jaya, Selangor

=== Malta ===
- Valletta
- Senglea
- SmartCity

=== Mexico ===
Most Mexican cities founded during the period of New Spain were planned from the beginning. There are historical maps showing the designs of most cities; however, as time passed and the cities grew, the original planning disappeared. A number of tourist cities have recently been built, such as Cancun or Puerto Peñasco; the latest city to be planned in Mexico was Delicias. Some of these cities are:

- Colombia, Nuevo León
- Guadalajara, Jalisco
- Mexico City, Federal District
- Nuevo Laredo, Tamaulipas
- Puebla, Puebla
- Veracruz, Veracruz

==== Recent times ====
- Altavista de Ramos, Jalisco
- Cancún, Quintana Roo
- Ciudad Bugambilias, Zapopan, Jalisco
- Ciudad Sahagún, Hidalgo
- Delicias, Chihuahua
- Ensenada, Baja California
- Hacienda Santa Fe, Tlajomulco de Zúñiga, Jalisco
- Puerto Peñasco, Sonora

=== Monaco ===
- Fontvieille – started 1971 and finished in the early 1980s
- Le Portier – a district to be built in the west of Fontvieille

=== Myanmar ===
- Naypyidaw

=== Netherlands ===
- Almere
- Capelle aan den IJssel
- Dronten
- Emmeloord
- Emmen
- Den Helder
- Haarlemmermeer
- Hellevoetsluis
- Lelystad
- Nieuwegein
- Purmerend
- Spijkenisse
- Zeewolde
- Zoetermeer

=== New Zealand ===
- Pegasus Town
- Twizel

=== Nigeria ===
- Abuja
- Banana Island Lagos
- Bonny Island
- Centenary City- Economic City launched by the Nigerian government.
- Eko Atlantic City (EAC) – new private funded smart city
- Festac Town Lagos
- Greater Port Harcourt
- Ikeja Lagos
- Lekki Lagos
- Victoria Island Lagos

=== North Korea ===
- Pyongyang - vast parts of the city were planned and rebuilt following the Korean War.
- Hamhung - Rebuilt following the Korean War with the aid of East German and Eastern Bloc architects and urban planners

=== Norway ===
- Nordstern – planned by occupying Nazi officials in Norway; never built

== O ==
=== Oman ===
- Al Duqm – Planned new special economic city, with area of 2000 km2

== P ==
=== Pakistan ===
- Gwadar
  - Gwadar Port City
- Islamabad
  - Bahria Enclave
  - Bahria Town Rawalpindi
  - Capital Smart City
  - DHA Islamabad
  - New Murree – near Islamabad
- Karachi
  - Bahria Town Karachi
  - Bodha Island City
  - Crescent Bay, Karachi
  - DHA City
- Lahore
  - Bahria Town Lahore
  - LDA City
  - River Ravifront
- Nawabshah
  - Bahria Town Nawabshah

=== Palestine ===
- Rawabi – construction began in January 2010

=== Philippines ===
- Baguio
- General Santos
- Koronadal
- Manila – Planned according to the Laws of the Indies during the Spanish Colonial Period. Towns and parishes surrounding Spanish Manila (Intramuros) grew following the contour of the Pasig River or organically. By the late 19th century, this town and parishes were absorbed to create the modern-day city of Manila planned by American architect Daniel Burnham. However, his plan was never fully realized because of the outbreak of World War II. There are six circumferential roads and ten radial roads in Metro Manila with the City of Manila as its axis (focal center).
- New Clark City
- Palayan
- Quezon City
- Samal, Davao del Norte
- Trece Martires

=== Poland ===
- Borne Sulinowo – former German military base, then Soviet secret city, and, since 1993, Polish town
- Elbląg
- Gdynia
- Łódź
- Nowa Huta – showpiece of Polish socialist realist-era urban planning; now incorporated into the royal city of Kraków
- Tychy Nowe Tychy, New Tychy
- Ursynów
- Zamość – a UNESCO World Heritage Site; the result of the opulently wealthy Polish chancellor Jan Zamoyski's financial empire; modeled on Italian-Renaissance theories of the "ideal city" and built by the architect Bernardo Morando; a perfect example of late 16th-century Renaissance urban-planning ideals

=== Portugal ===
- Braga – 16th-century expansion
- Espinho – 19th century
- Lisbon – reconstruction of downtown after the 1755 Lisbon earthquake. Some other buildings and structures of the city survived or suffered only partial or small degree of damage.
- Nisa – medieval town
- Porto Covo – 18th century
- Vila Nova de Santo André – 20th century
- Vila Real de Santo António – 18th century

== Q – R ==
=== Qatar ===
- Lusail

=== Romania ===
- Alexandria
- Drobeta-Turnu Severin
- Onești
- Turnu Măgurele
- Victoria

=== Russia ===
- Akademgorodok
- Anapa
- Ekaterinburg
- Kizlyar
- Korolyov
- Kronstadt
- Magnitogorsk
- Moscow – have original round plan
- Mozdok
- Naberezhnye Chelny
- Orenburg
- Protvino
- Rostov on Don
- Saint Petersburg
- Toliatti
- Zelenograd

== S ==
=== Saudi Arabia ===
- Jubail
- King Abdullah Economic City – under development; announced in 2005; at 2012, some stages completed; scheduled 2020 completion
- Prince Abdulaziz Bin Mousaed Economic City – under development
- Yanbu
- NEOM, under development

=== Serbia ===
- Bor
- Kikinda
- Majdanpek
- Novi Beograd

=== Singapore ===
==== Towns built in the 1960s ====
- Chai Chee
- MacPherson
- Queenstown
- Tiong Bahru
- Toa Payoh

==== Towns built in the 1970s ====
- Ang Mo Kio
- Bedok
- Bukit Timah – Farrer Road
- Clementi
- Dover
- Geylang East – Sims Drive, Jalan Eunos and Haig Road
- Hillview
- Hougang
- Kallang – Kallang Basin and St George
- Marine Parade
- Marsiling
- Queenstown – Ghim Moh and Holland Village
- Teck Whye
- Telok Blangah

==== Cities built in the 1980s ====
- Bedok, Kaki Bukit
- Bishan
- Bukit Batok
- Bukit Panjang
- Bukit Timah, Toh Yi
- Hougang
- Jurong East
- Jurong West, including Nanyang
- Kallang, McNair
- Kembangan
- Potong Pasir
- Serangoon
- Simei
- Tampines
- Toa Payoh, Upper Aljunied
- Ubi
- Woodlands

==== Cities built in the 1990s ====
- Choa Chu Kang
- Jurong West (Pioneer)
- Sembawang
- Sengkang

==== Cities built in the 2000s ====
- Marina Bay
- Punggol

==== Cities built in the 2010s ====
- Bidadari
- Punggol Northshore
- Simpang
- Tampines North
- Tengah

=== Slovakia ===
- Nová Dubnica
- Partizánske
- Petržalka
- Svit

=== Slovenia ===
- Nova Gorica
- Velenje

=== South Africa ===
- Sasolburg, Free State
- Welkom, Free State
- Queenstown, Eastern Cape, Eastern Cape

=== South Korea ===
- Ansan
- Bundang
- Changwon
- Gwacheon
- Sejong City – proposed multifunctional administrative city
- New Songdo City

=== Spain ===
- Badia del Vallès, Barcelona
- La Carolina
- Nuevo Baztán
- Tres Cantos

=== Sweden ===
- Falköping, Västergötland
- Gothenburg, Västergötland and Bohuslän
- Hässleholm, Scania
- Jakriborg, Scania
- Karlshamn, Blekinge (naval fortress town)
- Karlskrona, Blekinge (naval fortress town)
- Kiruna, Lapland
- Kristianstad, Scania (fortress town)
- Nässjö, Småland
- Stockholm, Södermanland and Uppland – satellite towns
  - Farsta
  - Skarpnäcksfältet, Södermanland
  - Vällingby

=== Switzerland ===
- La Chaux-de-Fonds

== T ==
=== Taiwan ===
- Zhongxing New Village, Nantou County
- Danhai New Town (Chinese wiki page), New Taipei City
- Ciaotou New Town, Kaohsiung City
- Linkou New Town, New Taipei City
- Nankan New Town, Taoyuan City
- Zhubei City, Hsinchu County

=== Tajikistan ===
- Sayhun, Sudd
- Mohpari, Sugd

=== Turkey ===
- Adana
- Adıyaman
- Afyon (Afyonkarahisar)
- Ağrı
- Amasya
- Ankara
- Antalya
- Artvin
- Aydın
- Balıkesir

== U ==
=== Ukraine ===
- Pripyat – foundation in 1970; then the Ukrainian Soviet Socialist Republic; abandoned in 1986 due to a nuclear disaster
- Slavutych – built to replace Pripyat
- Mariupol
- Enerhodar

=== United Kingdom ===
This includes all new towns created under the New Towns Act 1946 (9 & 10 Geo. 6. c. 68) and successive acts, as well as some communities not designated under this name. Salisbury is not listed as the chequers were part of its medieval design. Roman towns are not listed.

==== England ====
- Newton Aycliffe
- Barrow-in-Furness
- Basildon
- Bracknell
- Chorley
- Corby
- Crawley
- Harlow
- Hatfield
- Hemel Hempstead
- Letchworth Garden City
- Milton Keynes – "New City"
- Northampton
- Peterborough (Already a city)
- Peterlee
- Poundbury
- Redditch
- Runcorn
- Skelmersdale
- Stevenage
- Telford
- Warrington
- Washington
- Welwyn Garden City

==== Northern Ireland ====
- Antrim
- Ballymena
- Craigavon
- Derry (already a city)

==== Scotland ====
- Cumbernauld
- East Kilbride
- Fochabers
- Glenrothes
- Inveraray
- Irvine
- Livingston
- Pulteneytown
- Tornagrain
- Ullapool

==== Wales ====
- Cwmbran
- Newtown

=== United States ===
==== New communities built in the Colonial and post-Colonial era ====
- Annapolis, Maryland
- Augusta, Georgia
- Charleston, South Carolina
- Columbia, South Carolina
- Erie, Pennsylvania
- Holyoke, Massachusetts
- Mobile, Alabama
- New Haven, Connecticut
- New Orleans, Louisiana
- Paterson, New Jersey
- Philadelphia, Pennsylvania
- Raleigh, North Carolina
- Richmond, Virginia
- Rogersville, Tennessee
- Savannah, Georgia – the first planned city in America; founded in 1733
- Washington, D.C.
- Williamsburg, Virginia
- Wilmington, North Carolina
- Winston-Salem, North Carolina – planned by the Moravians; later merged with Winston

==== New communities built in the 19th century ====
- Amarillo, Texas
- Austin, Texas
- Back Bay – section of Boston, Massachusetts
- Brownsville, Texas
- Buffalo, New York
- Corpus Christi, Texas
- Dallas, Texas
- DuPont, Washington
- Fort Worth, Texas
- Glendale, Ohio
- Houston, Texas
- Huntington, West Virginia
- Indianapolis, Indiana
- Llewellyn Park, New Jersey
- Manchester, New Hampshire
- Most of the Manhattan borough of New York City, New York – New York City originated in the 1620s without a master plan, but the Commissioners' Plan of 1811 defined the street layout for the borough north of Houston Street.
- Memphis, Tennessee – a grid plan with a public promenade along the Mississippi River and four designated public squares; surveyed in 1819
- Midland, Texas
- Milledgeville, Georgia
- New Plymouth, Idaho
- Parksley, Virginia
- Pullman, Illinois – now part of Chicago
- Riverside, Illinois
- San Antonio, Texas
- Salt Lake City, Utah
- Shreveport, Louisiana
- St. Petersburg, Florida
- Tallahassee, Florida
- Tampa, Florida
- Topeka, Kansas
- Vandergrift, Pennsylvania

==== New communities built in the early 20th century ====
- Atascadero, California
- Avondale Estates, Georgia
- Baldwin Hills Village, California
- Cerritos, California
- Chatham Village, Pittsburgh
- Commerce, California
- Coral Gables, Florida
- Dundalk, Maryland
- Fairfield, Alabama
- Highland Park, Texas
- Industry, California
- Kingsport, Tennessee
- Las Vegas, Nevada
- Longview, Washington
- Mariemont, Ohio
- Minden, Nevada
- Mountain Lakes, New Jersey
- Radburn, New Jersey
- Roland Park, Baltimore, Maryland
- Shaker Heights, Ohio
- Sugar Land, Texas
- Sunnyside Gardens, New York
- Twin Falls, Idaho
- Venice, Florida
- The Woodlands, Texas

==== New communities built with federal aid in the 1930s and for Defense Housing in Early 1940s ====
- Arthurdale, West Virginia
- Audubon Park, New Jersey
- Boulder City, Nevada
- Greenbelt, Maryland
- Greendale, Wisconsin
- Greenhills, Ohio
- Henderson, Nevada
- Norris, Tennessee
- Roosevelt, New Jersey
- Winfield Township, New Jersey

==== Secret cities built as part of the Manhattan Project ====
The Manhattan Project was the successful effort by the U.S. government to develop an atomic bomb during World War II.

- Los Alamos, New Mexico
- Oak Ridge, Tennessee
- Richland, Washington

==== New communities built privately in the post-World War II era ====
- Babbitt, Minnesota
- California City, California
- Cape Coral, Florida
- Hoyt Lakes, Minnesota
- Joppatowne, Maryland
- Levittown, New York
- Levittown, Pennsylvania
- Park Forest, Illinois
- Rohnert Park, California
- Sharpstown, Houston, Texas
- Silver Bay, Minnesota
- Willingboro, New Jersey

==== New communities built in the 1960s and 1970s ====
- Anaheim Hills, California*
- Arcosanti, Arizona
- Audubon New Community, New York – near Buffalo
- Aventura, Florida
- Clear Lake City, Houston, Texas
- Columbia, Maryland
- Cold Spring, Maryland – Baltimore
- Coral Springs, Florida
- Coto de Caza, California
- Crofton, Maryland
- First Colony, Sugar Land, Texas – see Sugar Land, Texas
- Foster City, California
- Hawaii Kai, Hawaii
- Irvine, California*
- King City, Oregon
- Kingwood, Houston, Texas
- La Vista, Nebraska
- Las Colinas, Irving, Texas
- Laguna Niguel, California
- Mililani, Hawaii*
- Mission Viejo, California
- Palm Coast, Florida
- Peachtree City, Georgia
- Peachtree Corners, Georgia
- Reston, Virginia
- Rio Rancho, New Mexico
- Sugar Creek, Sugar Land, Texas – see Sugar Land, Texas
- Sunriver, Oregon
- Valley Ranch, Irving, Texas
- Village of Cross Keys, Maryland – see Baltimore, Maryland
- Woodhaven, Fort Worth, Texas

• Anaheim Hills and Irvine, California; and Mililani, Hawaii, began construction in the 1970s, but have not been completed due to their size, and will not be completed for at least ten years.

==== New communities sponsored by the U.S. Department of Housing and Urban Development after 1970 ====
- Cedar-Riverside, Minnesota – Minneapolis, Minnesota
- Flower Mound, Texas – near Dallas, Texas
- Gananda, New York – near Rochester, New York
- Harbison, South Carolina – near Columbia, South Carolina
- Jonathan, Minnesota – near Minneapolis
- Maumelle, Arkansas – near Little Rock, Arkansas
- Newfields, Ohio – Dayton, Ohio
- Park Forest South, Illinois – near Chicago, Illinois
- Radisson, New York – near Syracuse, New York
- Riverton, New York – near Rochester, New York
- Roosevelt Island, New York – part of New York City
- Shenandoah, Georgia – near Atlanta, Georgia
- Soul City, North Carolina – Warren County, North Carolina
- St. Charles, Maryland – Charles County, Maryland
- San Antonio Ranch, Texas – near San Antonio, Texas
- The Woodlands, Texas – near Houston, Texas

==== New communities built privately in the 1980s and 1990s ====
- Aliso Viejo, California
- Anthem, Arizona
- Carolina Forest, South Carolina
- Celebration, Florida
- Eagle Mountain, Utah
- Greatwood, Sugar Land, Texas – see Sugar Land, Texas
- Kapolei, Hawaii
- Laguna West, California
- New Territory, Sugar Land, Texas – see Sugar Land, Texas
- Phillips Ranch, California
- Port Liberte, New Jersey
- Rancho Santa Margarita, California
- Seaside, Florida
- Southern Village, North Carolina
- Summerlin, Nevada – in the Las Vegas Valley
- Suncadia, Washington
- Viera, Florida
- Westchase, Florida
- Weston, Florida

==== New communities built privately in the 21st century ====
- Ave Maria, Florida
- Bayview-Hunters Point, San Francisco, California
- Lakewood Ranch, Florida
- Nocatee, Florida
- Carlton Landing, Oklahoma

==== Unbuilt or under construction planned cities ====
Examples of unbuilt planned cities include Walt Disney's Progress City in Florida and Frank Lloyd Wright's Broadacre City.

The following list is organized by state:

- California
  - Brisbane Baylands
  - California Forever
  - Centennial
  - Civita
  - Mountain House
  - Newhall Ranch
  - Paradise Valley
  - Quay Valley
  - River Islands at Lathrop
  - Sonoma Mountain Village Rohnert Park
  - Sutter Pointe
  - Tejon Mountain Village
  - Travertine Point
  - Treasure Island
  - Yokohl Ranch
- Arizona (Phoenix metropolitan area)
  - Buckeye
    - Douglas Ranch
    - Paradise Farms
    - Tartesso
    - Verrado
- Florida
  - Babcock Ranch
  - Town of Big Cypress
  - Destiny
  - Nocatee
- Other states
  - Coyote Springs, Nevada
  - Forest Lake, Oregon
  - Laurent, South Dakota
  - Mesa del Sol, New Mexico
  - Minnesota Experimental City, Minnesota
  - Paulville, Texas
  - Seward's Success, Alaska
  - Sterling Ranch, Colorado

== V – Z ==
=== Venezuela ===
- Ciudad Guayana

=== Yemen ===
- Al Noor City – twin city to one of the same name in Djibouti

=== Vietnam ===
- Vinhomes Times City, Hanoi – rezoned from the former textile factories
- Thủ Đức – formerly Thủ Đức District, District 2 and District 9, Ho Chi Minh City
  - Thủ Thiêm New Urban Area new central business district and administrative center on the east of the historic city center
- Phú Mỹ Hưng Urban Area – built on part of the southern suburb of Ho Chi Minh City
- Bình Dương New City – northern satellite city of Ho Chi Minh City

== See also ==
- List of urban plans
