= Henry Turney McKnight =

Henry T. McKnight

Member of the Minnesota Senate

Member of the U.S. House of Representatives from 's 31st (1963–1966) 33rd (1967–1971) district
- In office January 8, 1963 – January 4, 1971
- Preceded by: Ralph L. Mayhood (Dist. 31)
- Succeeded by: George S. Pillsbury (Dist. 33)

Personal details
- Born: Henry Turney McKnight; April 2, 1913 Minneapolis, Minnesota, U.S.
- Died: December 30, 1972 (aged 59) Minneapolis, Minnesota, U.S.
- Resting place: Lakewood Cemetery
- Party: Nonpartisan (caucused with Conservatives)
- Education: Yale University (BA)
- Occupation: Real estate developer, Conservationist
- Known for: Founder of Jonathan, Minnesota
- Awards: Bronze Star

Military service
- Branch/service: United States Navy
- Rank: Lieutenant commander
- Unit: Landing Craft Support (LCS(L))
- Battles/wars: World War II (Pacific Theater)

Henry Turney McKnight (April 2, 1913 – December 30, 1972) was an American businessman, conservationist, and politician who served in the Minnesota Senate from 1963 to 1971. A resident of Wayzata, Minnesota, he is best known as the founder of Jonathan, Minnesota, a pioneering planned community in Chaska, Minnesota.

== Early life and education ==
McKnight was born into a prominent Minneapolis family known for its civic and commercial contributions to the Upper Midwest. He attended the Blake School and graduated from Yale University in 1936. Following his education, he managed family agricultural and real estate development interests before entering military service.

== Military service ==
During World War II, McKnight served in the United States Navy from 1942 to 1945 in the Pacific Theater. He rose to the rank of lieutenant commander and served as the commanding officer of a Landing Craft Support (Large) Mark 3, designation LCS(L)(3), which was then casually (and is now quaintly) referred to as a "rocket ship", due to its complement of 10 rocket launchers (mounted bazookas), in addition to its 3-inch/50 cal and various smaller guns. The LCS(L)(3) provided close-in naval gunfire support during amphibious operations. McKnight was awarded the Bronze Star for "conspicuous gallantry and intrepidity in combat".

== Legislative career and conservation ==
McKnight served in the Minnesota Senate for two terms, representing Hennepin County via District 31 (1963–1966) and District 33 (1967–1970). He gained national recognition as a conservationist, serving as a director of Keep Minnesota Green, Inc. and president of the Quetico-Superior Foundation.

His primary achievement was the Omnibus Natural Resources and Recreation Act of 1963, which he chief-authored. This act established the Minnesota Outdoor Recreation Resources Commission (MORRC)—the predecessor to the current Legislative-Citizen Commission on Minnesota Resources (LCCMR)—and created a dedicated funding stream for state parks via a cigarette tax. His work also provided the statutory framework for the Minnesota Environmental Rights Act (MERA), which became law in 1971.

== Development and urban planning ==
Beginning in 1966, McKnight transitioned into urban planning by spearheading two of the nation's most ambitious projects under the New Town movement.

=== Jonathan ===
He formed the Jonathan Development Corporation to create Jonathan, a self-contained community designed to balance residential zones with nature preserves. Under the HUD New Communities Program, Jonathan became the first large-scale project in the U.S. to receive federal loan guarantees under the Urban Growth and New Community Development Act of 1970.

=== Cedar-Riverside ===
McKnight partnered with Keith Heller and Gloria Segal in Cedar-Riverside Associates (CRA) to develop a high-density "New Town-in-Town" in Minneapolis. A prominent legacy of this urban vision is the 39-story McKnight Tower (also known as the "M Building") within the Riverside Plaza complex, designed by architect Ralph Rapson.

== Death and legacy ==
McKnight died of a brain tumor on December 30, 1972, at the age of 59. He is buried in Lakewood Cemetery. The community of Jonathan and the modernist landmark of Riverside Plaza remain as enduring models of his philosophy regarding planned urbanization.
