= New Urban Communities Authority =

Egyptian state enterprise in charge of the Egyptian New Cities

- هيئة المجتمعات العمرانية الجديدة
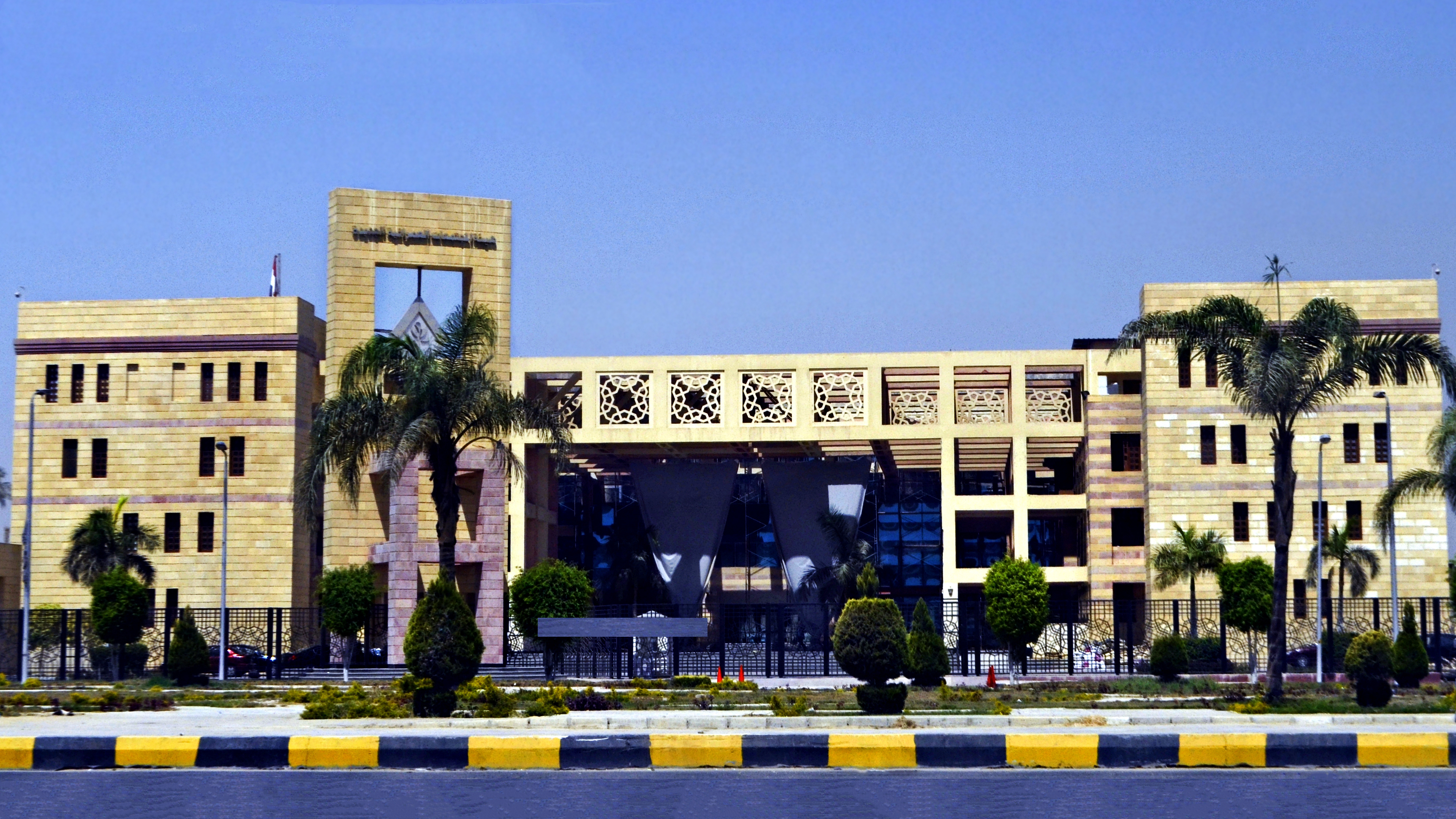
- NUCA headquarters, in Sheikh Zayed City.

Agency overview
- Formed: 1979
- Jurisdiction: Government of Egypt
- Headquarters: Sheikh Zayed City, Egypt
- Agency executives: Abdel-Muttalib Mamdouh, Vice President; Engineer Gamal Talaat, Assistant Vice President
- Parent Agency: Ministry of Housing
- Website: www.nuca.gov.eg www.newcities.gov.eg

The New Urban Communities Authority (Arabic: هيئة المجتمعات العمرانية الجديدة) is an Egyptian state owned enterprise (SOE) established in 1979 and affiliated to the Ministry of Housing. It is the exclusive satellite city developer in Egypt, in addition to being Egypt's largest real estate developer and constructor of residential units. These activities resulted in revenue of LE 57bn in FY 2019/2020, making it the third largest SOE after petroleum and the Suez Canal.

NUCA was originally tasked with addressing housing issues in Egypt by developing new urban communities to redistribute the population of existing cities away from Egypt's Nile valley and delta, and into the desert in order to save agricultural land from being urbanized. But after four decades of working under a strict policy of desert development, NUCA's mandate was modified in 2018 allowing it to develop land and real estate projects on agricultural land and within existing cities.

Since 1979, NUCA's main role is master developer of the 2.3 million feddans (acres) of state-owned land assigned to it over the years, subdividing it and laying trunk infrastructure, as well as constructing water and wastewater treatment plants, buildings for public schools, hospitals and government agencies. Through its city development agencies (jihaz tanmiyat al-madina), it sells land parcels to individuals and real estate developers for residential and other purposes.

NUCA is also the regulator of the new urban communities under its jurisdiction. Its chairman, the Minister of Housing, Utilities and Urban Communities issues planning permits and oversees the communities, while the appointed city agency heads issue building permits and run the day-to-day affairs of functioning towns, as the new urban communities do not fall under regular local administration. Its headquarters are in Sheikh Zayed City in Greater Cairo.

== New communities ==
Over the course of 46 years, NUCA built 49 new towns and satellite cities on 9001 Km2 or 2.2 million acres of land in 23 out of Egypt’s 27 governorates. Since 2014, it started planning a new batch of 37 fourth-generation towns cities spread over around 167,000 feddans of land, where by 2021 17 were under construction.

| First Generation | 1977–1982 | 10th of Ramadan, New Borg El Arab, 15th of May, New Damietta, 6th of October, New Salhia, Sadat |
| Second Generation | 1982–2000 | New Cairo, Sheikh Zayed City, Badr, Obour, New Beni Suef, New Minya, New Nubariya, El Shorouk |
| Third Generation | 2000–2014 | New Asyut, New Tiba, New Sohag, New Aswan, New Qena, New Faiyum, New Akhmim |
| Fourth Generation | 2014- | Under construction: The New Capital, New Alamein, New Mansoura, New Toshka, New Farafra, East Port Said; Strategic plans: Suez, New Rosetta, New Beni Mazar; Under planning: New Gerga, New Esna, New Hurghada, New Nasser City |

New Communities not under NUCA's administration:

New Galala City

== Real estate developer ==
In addition to its city developer role, NUCA acts as a real estate developer where it has recently built and sold over 77,000 for profit housing units such as the Sakan Masr and Dar Masr and Janna projects across Egypt, as well as skyscrapers in Maspero, the New Administrative Capital, and New Alamein. According to a NUCA executive, they account for 28% of its income.

In addition to its in-house real estate development, NUCA, along with the Housing and Development Bank which it controls, owns a number of real estate developers:

- City Edge Developments (84%)
- Hyde Park Developments (78%)
- Saudi Egyptian Developers (50%)
- Administrative Capital for Urban Development - ACUD (The city developer of the New Administrative Capital, 49%)

In 2024, NUCA and the Abu Dhabi Developmental Holding Company (ADQ), a sovereign wealth fund based in the United Arab Emirates, signed a deal for the ADQ to invest $35 billion in developing Ras el-Hekma into a tourist resort. The deal grants ADQ the right to develop 130 million square metres of land, and is the largest foreign investment deal in Egypt's history.
