= National Urban Policy and New Community Development Act of 1970 =

The Urban Growth and New Community Development Act (Renamed National Urban Policy and New Community Development Act of 1970, Pub. L. 91–609, title VII, 1970-12-31, 84 Stat. 1791, 42 U.S.C. § 4501 et seq.) is a statute enacted by the United States Congress in 1970.

The act, championed by Senator Thomas W. L. Ashley, provided federal support for the development of new towns by private developers through the department of Housing and Urban Development. The New Community Development Corporation was formed to distribute and manage $500 million in bond guarantees to developers in increments of up to $50 million per project. Thirteen of these "Title VII" "New Towns" were established with HUD funds before the project was scrapped in 1978. New York State initiated a related program funding three additional communities. Most of the sites were green field development.

The act allowed up to 75% of development costs to state agencies to be granted by the program, and planning grants of 66% of the cost of the development to be awarded directly to the developer. Provisions also allowed HUD funding for "functionally obsolete" buildings rather than the previous slum or blighted conditions requirement.

The program was the update of the 1966 Model Cities program presented to President Johnson by Walter P. Reuther on 15 May 1965 leading to the Housing and Urban Development Act of 1965 and the Housing and Urban Development Act of 1968. A report was mandated every two years, with publication in 1972, 1974, and 1976.

== Title VII New Towns ==
=== Thirteen funded developments ===
- St. Charles, Maryland
- Cedar-Riverside, Minneapolis
- Jonathan, Minnesota
- Gananda, New York
- Flower Mound, Texas
- Harbison, South Carolina
- Maumelle, Arkansas
- Newfields, Ohio
- Park Forest South, Illinois
- Riverton, New York
- Shenandoah, Georgia
- Soul City, North Carolina
- The Woodlands, Texas

=== Two Certificate of Eligibility developments ===
- Radisson, New York
- Roosevelt Island, New York
