= New Nasser City =

City in Asyut Governorate, Egypt

- Coordinates: 27°04′25″N 31°05′11″E
- Country: Egypt
- Governorate: Asyut Governorate
- Established: 2017
- Named after: Gamal Abdel Nasser

Government
  - Head of the City Authority: Yasser Abdullah

Area
  - Total: 26.70 km^{2} (10.31 sq mi)
- Elevation: 170 m (560 ft)
- Time zone: UTC+2
- Area code: (+2) 088

New Nasser City, also known as West Asyut, is an Egyptian city of the fourth generation situated within Asyut Governorate. It is a fourth generation urban city and is administratively associated with the New Urban Communities Authority. Fourth generation cities are 14 new urban developments being constructed by the Egyptian Government. The combined area of these new developments is around 380,000 acres squared. These cities aim to challenge the problems of population growth in major Egyptian cities such as Cairo and Alexandria.

The establishment of New Nassar City was formalized by Presidential Decree No. 78 of 2017, and encompasses an area of approximately 6,006 acres (26.70 km^{2}). It is situated approximately 15 kilometers from Asyut city and 4 kilometers from Asyut International Airport. The city is designed to accommodate approximately 345,000 individuals.

== General scheme ==
The area of the New Nasser City is estimated at 6,006 acres of state-owned land situated at the top of the Western Plateau. The area of the first phase is estimated at 1,600 acres, which will be utilized to establish the new urban complex. This complex will encompass residential, recreational, economic, educational, and industrial areas, as well as small and medium-sized industrial facilities. In addition, the area comprises regional, religious, and health services, a commercial, governmental, and administrative services zone, a malls area, and a logistics area, which is situated in close proximity to Asyut International Airport. In addition, the following features are included:

- Educational, recreational, religious, and health services area.
- An industrial area that includes small and medium industries and is located in the southernmost part of the city.
- A logistics area located in the northern part of the city with an estimated area of 1,500 acres.

== Infrastructure ==
=== Drinking water and wastewater ===
- Built-in processing unit, with a capacity of 1000 meters/day.
- Drinking water and purification plant on an area of 35 acres with a capacity of 25,000 m3/day (first phase).
- Well station with a capacity of 1600 meters/day as an urgent solution to feed the Misr Housing and Social Housing buildings.
- A 20-kilometer-long, 1000-mm diameter Nile water transmission line to the city, which includes a lift station, 2 reservoirs, a generator building, and an administrative building.

=== Electricity ===
- As a provisional measure, a transformer station with a capacity of 40 MVA and 66 KV is proposed as an urgent solution. This would comprise nine distributors and a 40 MVA transformer, with the objective of feeding the entire city.
- An electricity network worth EGP 59 million.

=== Communication ===
- The civil works for the primary and secondary telephone networks have been concluded.

== Service ==
The city has a miniature youth center in the Misr Residence area, which is the city's first neighborhood. The center contains a social building, a swimming pool, tennis and five-a-side football fields, a commercial market with eight shops, a basic education school with 33 classrooms, which is located in the social housing service center, a nursery, a health unit, a police station, and a fire station.

=== Housing ===
- The city contains 15 buildings with 360 units as part of the Housing for All Egyptians project, in addition to the Housing Egypt project, which encompasses 60 buildings with 1,440 housing units. The project encompasses administrative units and shops. The Egypt Housing project encompasses 50 buildings with a total of 1,200 units, including administrative units and shops. Another project within the scope of the project encompasses 66 buildings with a total of 1,584 housing units.
- The Porto Asyut project, which aims to facilitate tourism development in an area of 78 acres, and the Zaho project, which seeks to advance housing and development in an area of 104 acres and more than 1,250 housing units, represent two significant initiatives in the region.

=== Education ===
- Badr University in Asyut is a private Egyptian institution of higher education owned by the Cairo Investment and Real Estate Development Company. It is situated on an 81-acre campus. The branch encompasses 17 faculties and is scheduled to commence operations with six medical faculties: human medicine, dentistry, pharmacy, physiotherapy, nursing, and biotechnology.

== See also ==
- New Asyut
- New Sohag
