= Riverton, New York =

Coordinates: 43.033°N 77.712°W

Riverton, New York, was a planned community built in 1973 in the town of Henrietta, New York, along the Genesee River. Riverton was seventh of the thirteen communities receiving federal guarantee assistance from HUD as part of their New Communities Program created by the Urban Growth and New Community Development Act of 1970. $12 million was earmarked for the community. Riverton was supposed to encompass a 2,335-acre (9 km^{2}) land area bordered on the north by the New York State Thruway, on the west by the Genesee River, on the east by East River Rd., and on the south by the Rush-Henrietta town line, with some development continuing east along Erie Station Rd. Original plans called for construction to occur for a 16-year period and eventually house over 25,000 people, with the community including an 18-hole golf course, 12 swimming pools, 3 artificial lakes, a marina on the Genesee, and commercial and industrial centers. However, only a small portion of this was built along Scottsville-West Henrietta Rd. Created as part of the community were Riverton Knolls, a moderately priced townhouse subdivision, the Riverton Golf Club, a small 9-hole golf course, and the Riverton Park, which included a playground, baseball diamond, river front benches, walking trail, and a volleyball court. Also nestled in a bend in the Genesee was a 28-acre (110,000 m^{2}) forested nature park.

Riverton was intended to connect to downtown Rochester via a rapid transit system running on nearby Erie Lackawanna Railroad tracks, which at the time was hosting passenger excursions via the fledgling Livonia, Avon and Lakeville Railroad to Genesee Junction. Language mandating such a rapid transit system was even written into the act creating the Rochester-Genesee Regional Transportation Authority as a "Charlotte-Henrietta Corridor." However, these plans never materialized. Also, New York State Route 253 was re-routed onto a new extended Erie Station Road from its original Scottsville-West Henrietta Road routing, which bisected the community.

Riverton never got far off the ground, in part because of its relatively remote location in far southern Monroe County. The project nearly went bankrupt in 1974 and had to be bailed out. By 1978, HUD had recommended Riverton to be discontinued from further federal assistance based on market studies that showed that Riverton was unlikely to develop into a successful city.

In 1979, Joseph C. DeMino, Inc., began leasing the golf course from the town of Henrietta. In 1983, real estate investment trust Home Properties acquired Riverton Knolls. Also, all the Riverton Park improvements were suspiciously destroyed by heavy construction equipment. In 1999, the town of Henrietta agreed to sell Riverton Golf Club and Park to Joseph DeMino for $509,000. This touched off controversy over the future of the nature park, as the DeMinos wanted to expand the golf club to a full 18 holes using the undeveloped land. Nevertheless, in 2002 the sale was finalized by the New York State Legislature. On December 6, 2006, Morgan Management purchased Riverton Knolls from Home Properties. In 2007, the town of Henrietta announced the plan of a new 71-acre (290,000 m^{2}) park located south of Scottsville-West Henrietta Rd along the Genesee tentatively named Riverfront Park.

Today, Riverton is all but gone as a separate community; most current residents identify with West Henrietta and share its ZIP code. The Riverton Golf Club continues to operate. Riverton Knolls is now a rental property with many renters tending to be students from the nearby Rochester Institute of Technology. In addition to the rented apartments and townhouses, there are over 500 single family homes and townhouses in the community.
