= Minnesota Renaissance Festival =

Renaissance fair

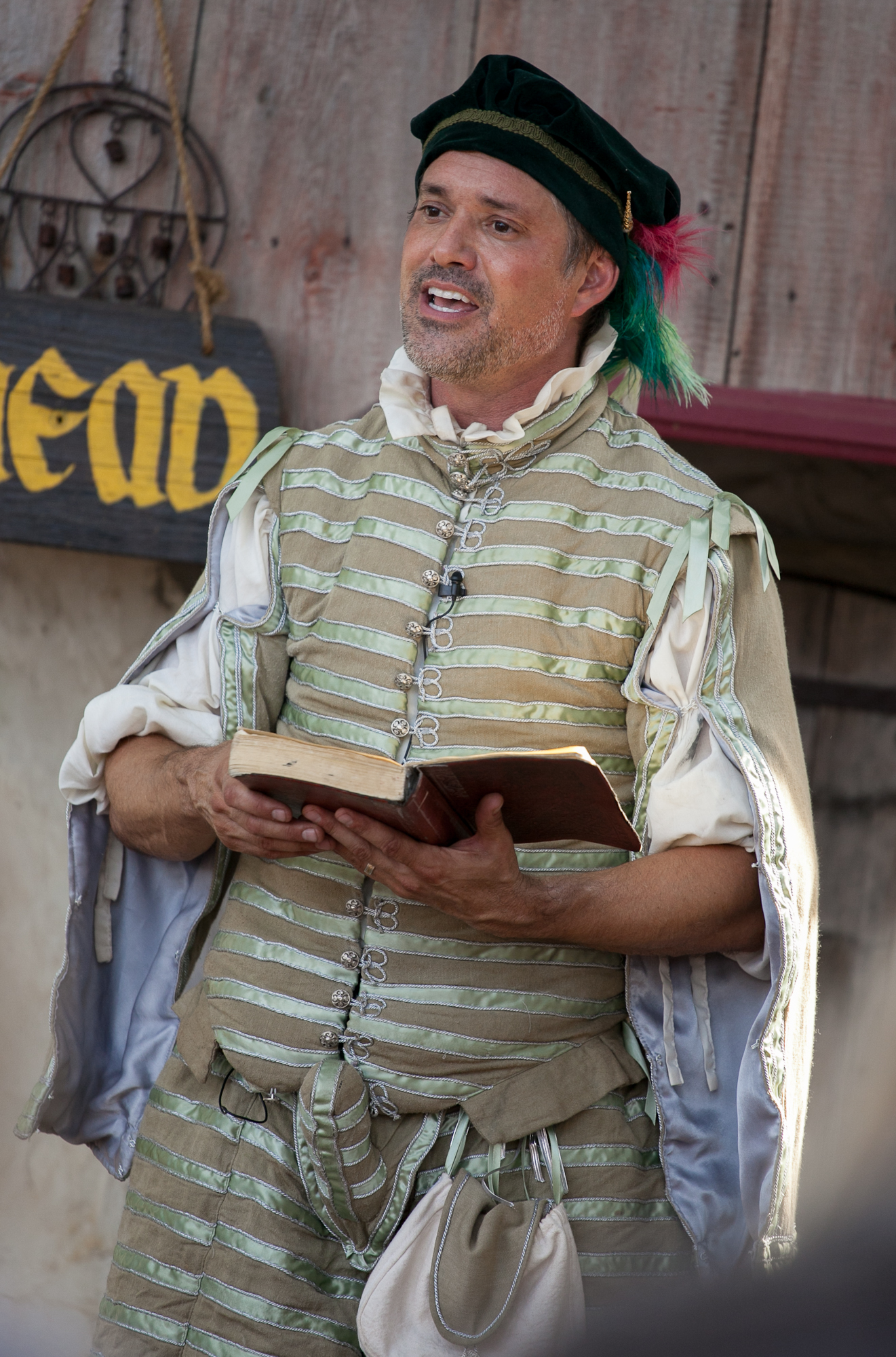
- Gordon Boudreau performing as Arthur Greenleaf Holmes in 2012
- Genre: Renaissance fair
- Dates: August - October
- Locations: Shakopee, Minnesota 44°44′47″N 93°35′56″W
- Inaugurated: 1971
- Attendance: 320,000 (average)
- Stages: 16
- Website: www.renaissancefest.com

The Minnesota Renaissance Festival is a Renaissance fair, an interactive outdoor event which focuses on recreating the look and feel of a fictional 16th Century "England-like" fantasy kingdom. It operates during seven consecutive weekends, from mid-August until the final week in September (or sometimes the first weekend in October) on a site near the Minnesota River in Shakopee, a suburb of the Twin Cities.

The Minnesota Renaissance Festival began on September 11, 1971, with Tovah Feldshuh as the Queen, in Jonathan, Minnesota. More than 25,000 people visited the two-weekend grand opening of the festival, at which time it was called Minnesota Renaissance Fair (changed to Minnesota Renaissance Festival later on) and promoted as “A Celebration of Nature, Art and Life!” It was at the Jonathan site in 1971 and 1972. In 1973, it moved to a farm on highway 41 up the hill [north] from Chaska, according to info on page 17 of the book "The History of the American Renaissance Festival" by Al Olson, published in 2021. In 1974, it moved to its current site in Shakopee, where it continues as one of the oldest and largest Renaissance festivals in the United States. It has played host to the early careers of such national acts as the magicians Penn & Teller and The Flying Karamazov Brothers juggling troupe, and it currently hosts acts such as Zilch the Torysteller, Puke and Snot, Johnny Phoenix, The Tortuga Twins, and The Danger Committee. On August 19, 1975, Penn & Teller did their first show together at the Minnesota Renaissance Festival, which they reprised 50 years later with a special appearance on Saturday, August 16, 2025. Jason Mraz also worked as a pickle boy (a boy or man who sells pickles) early in his performance career.

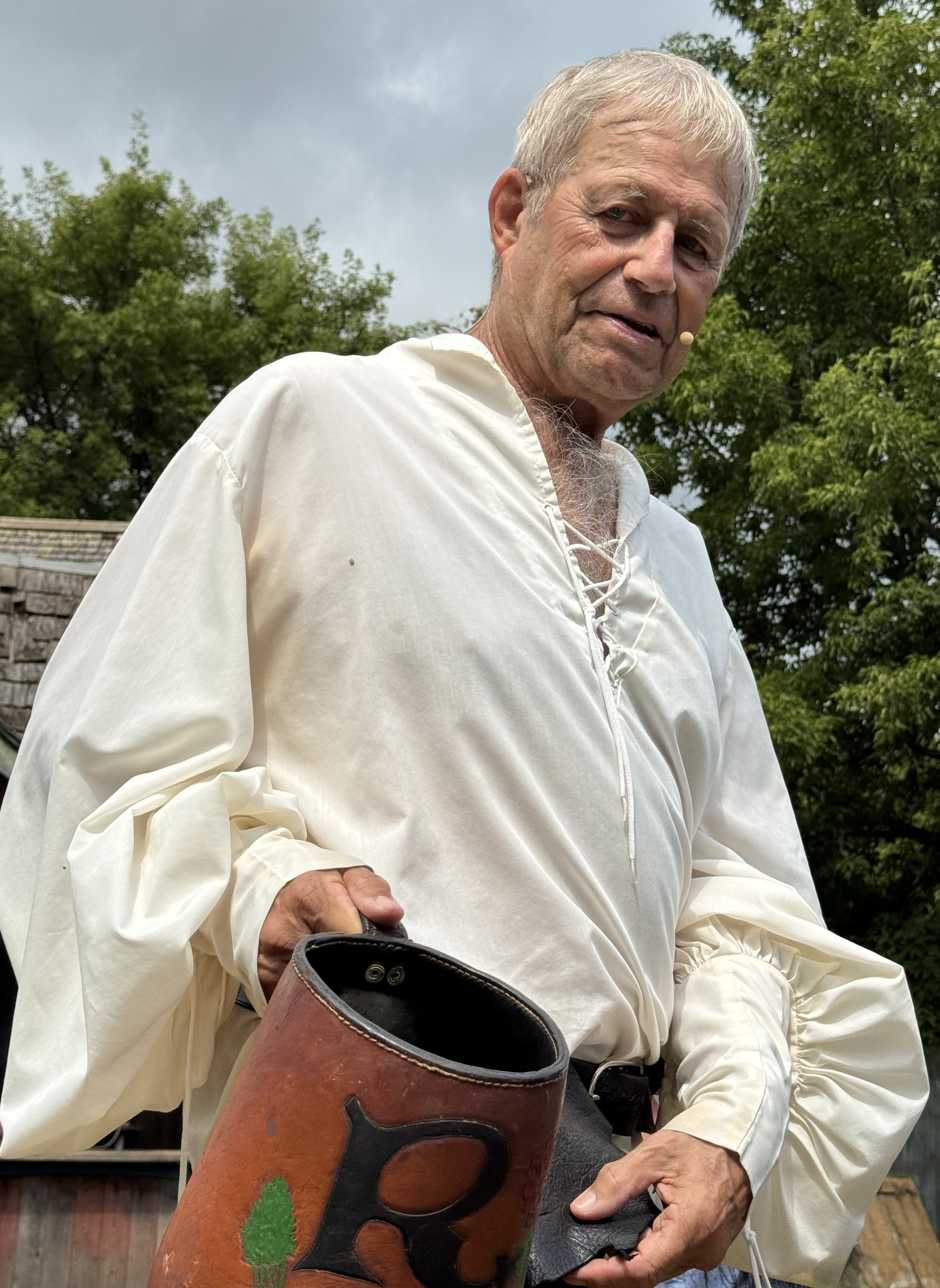
Mark Sieve performing as "Puke" of the long-running comedy show "Puke and Snot" at the 2025 Festival

The festival features over 700 entertainers, 275 crafters, and 120 food booths. Another popular feature is the Feast of Fantasy.

The Minnesota Renaissance Festival is one of several such events in the United States owned and operated by Mid-America Festivals, and it has grown to be one of the largest Renaissance Festivals in the United States, with an annual attendance of 300,000.

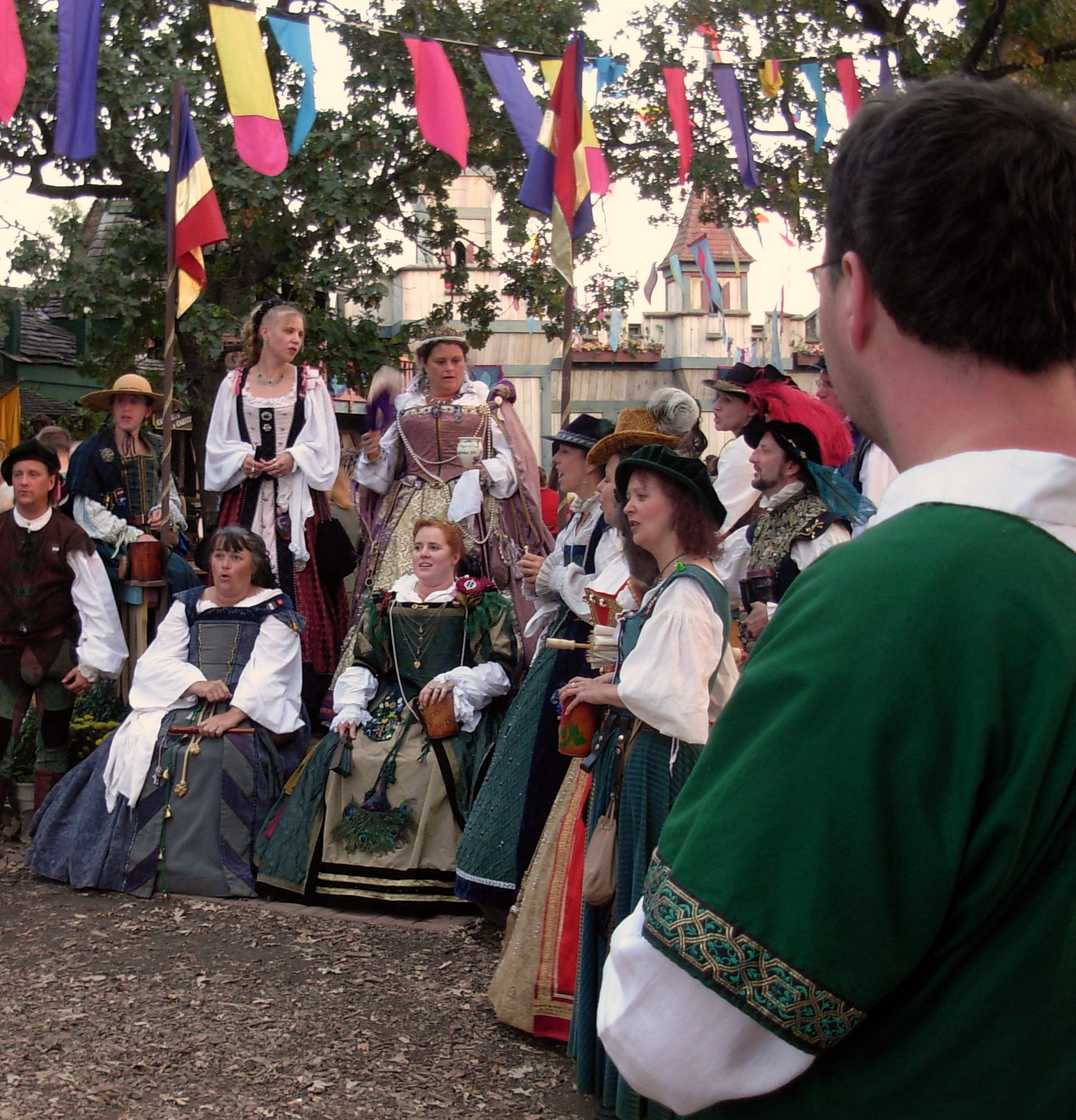
Costumed participants at the 2007 Festival

Because the land on which the festival was built is leased, in 2014 Mid-America Festivals announced that 2016 would likely be the last season in its current location. The lease contains a clause in which the owners can terminate the lease at any time. In 2016 Mid-America Festivals announced the lease term would expire in 2019. Currently, several sites are under consideration, including properties in other parts of Scott County and near Belle Plaine, Minnesota.

In December 2018 it was announced that the lease for the current site was extended through the 2020 season.

On August 19, 2020, it was stated on the Minnesota Renaissance Festival Facebook page that the 2020 season, which would have been the 50th season, was cancelled due to covid, and that the 2021 season will now be considered the 50th season. It was also stated that the lease for the current site was extended through the 2021 season, though no new updates regarding the proposed new permanent site have been made since it was announced in March 2019 that a site in or near Jordan, Minnesota was probable, and that land near the Scott County Fairgrounds had been purchased for that purpose.

On December 31, 2020, it was stated on the Minnesota Renaissance Festival Facebook page that the lease for the current site was extended through the 2022 season.

As of the 2025 season, the Festival remains in its historic location and has not moved.

== Travel to the Festival ==
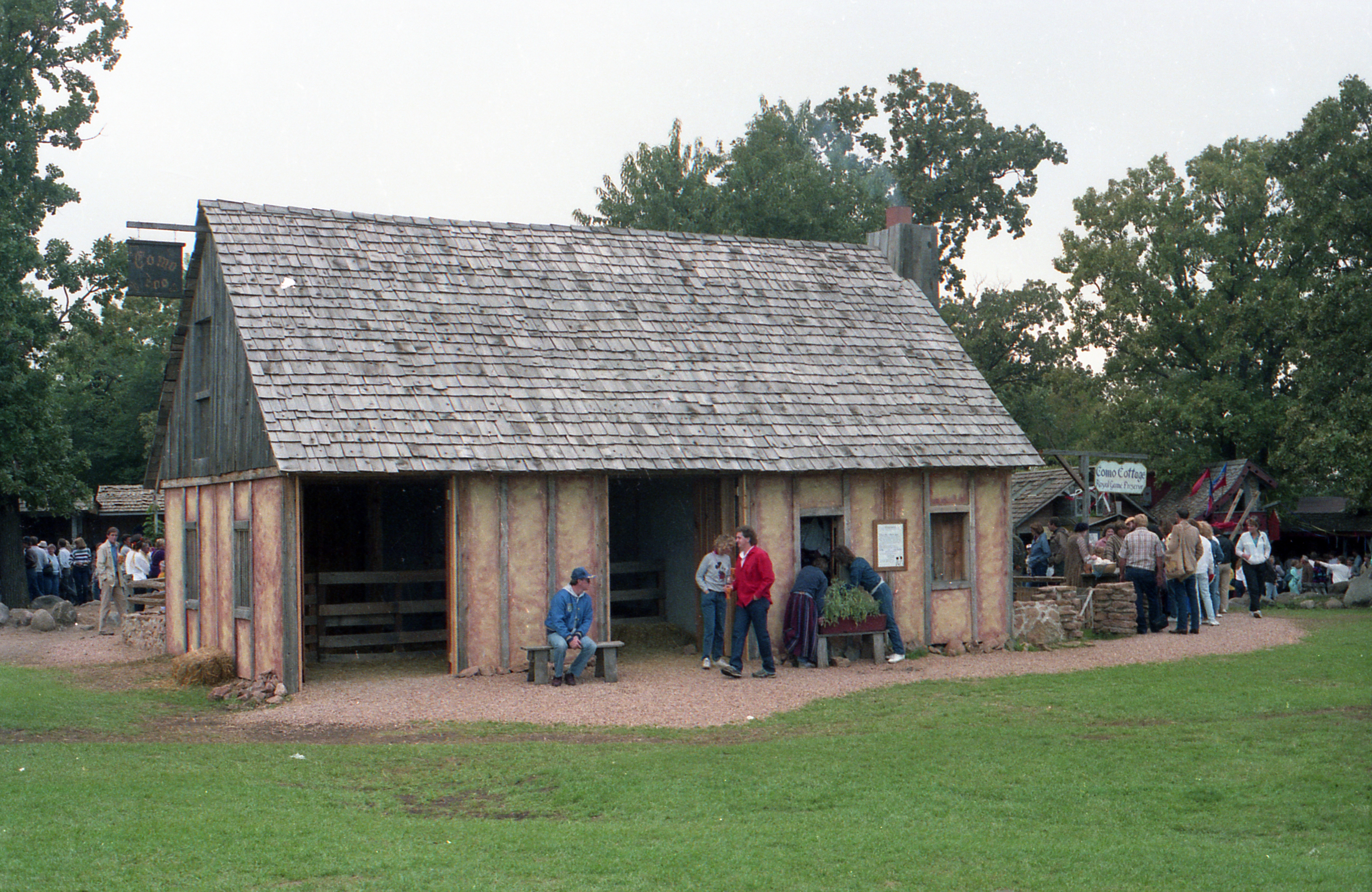
Como Cottage, built by the Como Zoo, at the festival in 1985.

The Minnesota Renaissance Festival had provided free parking at its site near Shakopee, but due to increasing traffic problems in 2023 they began limiting the number of vehicles using on-site parking by selling a limited number of date-specific parking vouchers. Directions are available from its website. Parking is available in parking lots accessible by two dirt roads, one from highway 41 and the other from highway 169, onto its 400-acre campus. Limited access to and from the festival site led to significant transportation issues including delays as long as two hours either entering or leaving the fairgrounds prior to the implementation of the new reservation system. Traffic problems had created significant backups and delays along Minnesota Highway 169 with traffic being identified as the number one issue.

In 2024, Minnesota Valley Transit Authority, Southwest Transit Authority, and Richfield Bus Company began running bus lines to the Renaissance grounds from multiple locations throughout the Twin Cities.

In the 1980s, the Minnesota Transportation Museum provided train trips to the Renaissance Festival using Northern Pacific 328. These trains used Chicago & North Western Railway tracks between Minneapolis and Merriam Junction, which is located next to the Renaissance Festival grounds. The rail line was severed between Hopkins and Chaska in 1991.

== See also ==
- List of Renaissance fairs
- Historical reenactment
- Jousting
- Society for Creative Anachronism
- List of open air and living history museums in the United States
