= New Mansoura =

- city
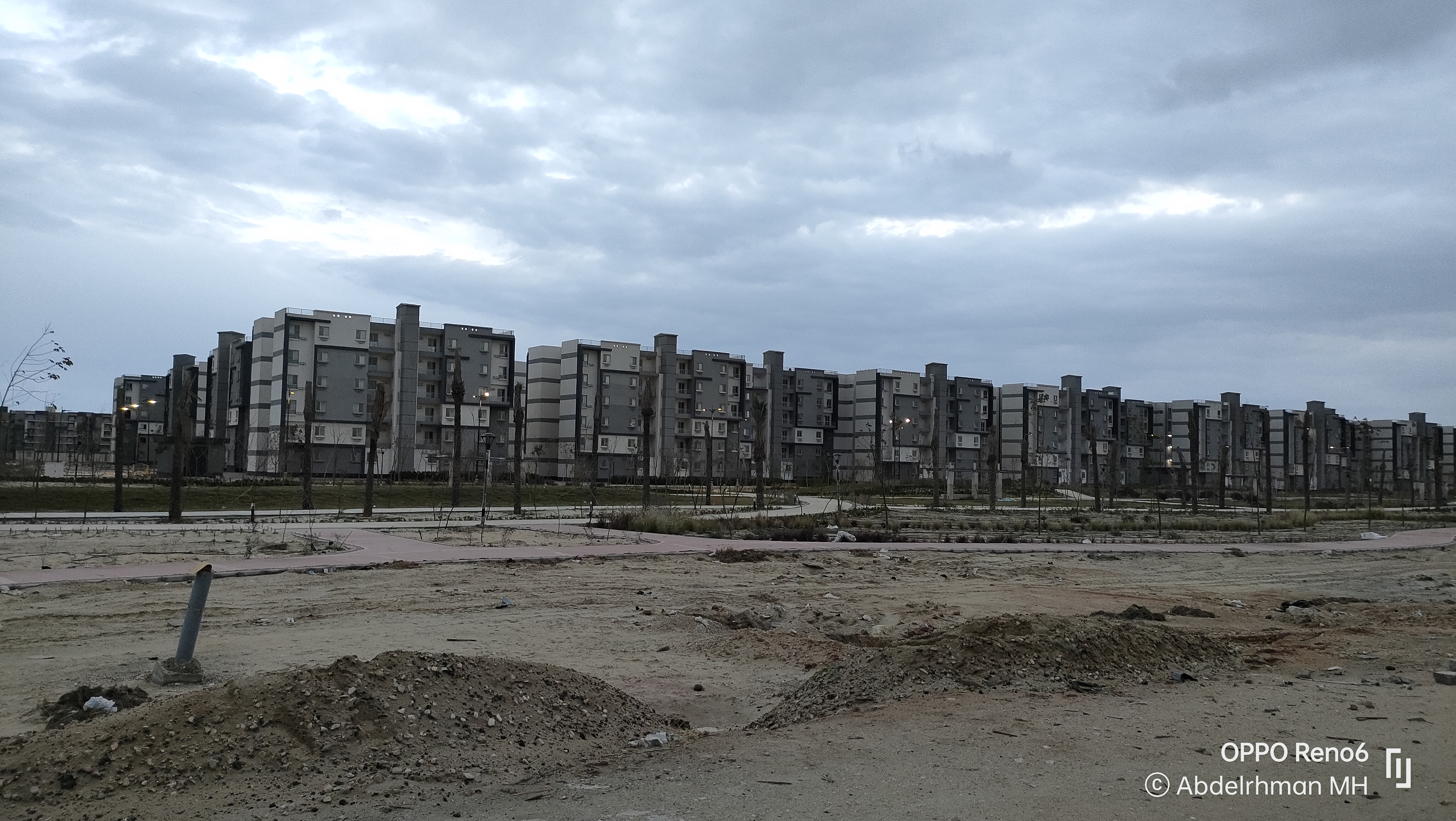

- Location in Egypt
- Coordinates: 31.4697372°N 31.4452037°E
- Country: Egypt
- Governorate: Dakahlia
- Time zone: UTC+2 (EET)
  - Summer (DST): UTC+3 (EEST)

New Mansoura, officially New Mansoura City, is a planned city in Egypt. It will lie on the Mediterranean coast, around 50 km north of Old Mansoura. The city represents one of several ambitious urban development projects of the government. With the help of which the problem of the congestion of the existing cities is to be solved. The development of the city will cost around 3.7 billion US dollar. It will cover 25.4 km^{2} stretching around 14 km along the coast and will have the capacity to house 1.5 million people when completed. The project is led by the New Urban Communities Authority.

The city will include residential areas, touristic resorts, industrial areas, a water desalination plant, a commercial market, a waterfront promenade and a university. A 2 km long marina will be constructed on reclaimed land. It is also intended that the city will become a center of medical tourism. Construction of the city started in 2017 and will be implemented in phases. The city will be connected to Old Mansoura by a newly-built electrified railway system.
