= Citra Raya =

Coordinates: 6°16′S 106°28′E

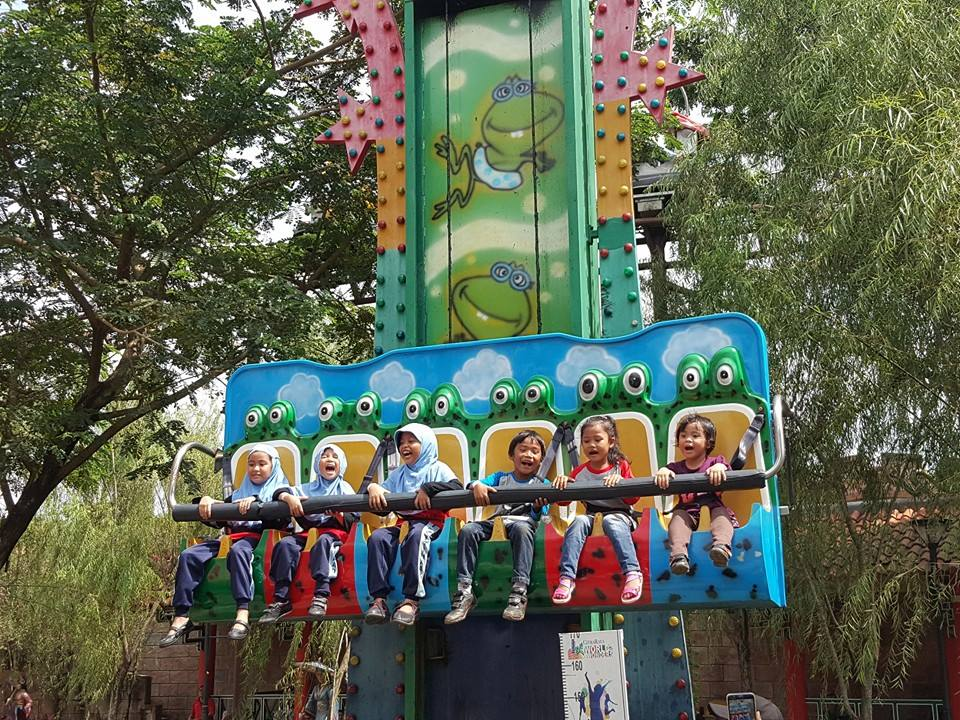
World of Wonders theme park at Citra Raya

Citra Raya Tangerang is the largest integrated city developed by the Ciputra Group at Cikupa and Panongan of Tangerang Regency in Indonesia, which is located about 40 km from the capital Jakarta. The township is within Greater Jakarta and has a land area of about 2,760 hectares. Development of the township began in 1994. Population of the township is over 65,000.

The township has three separate CBD with shopping centers, apartments and office towers.

== Infrastructures ==
The township is growing very rapidly. There are 54 residential clusters, over 2000 shop-houses and commercial buildings in the township at present. Ciputra Hospital is the only specialized health facility in the township. There is Amaris Hotel within the township. A Mal Ciputra is also located in the township.

=== Educational Institutions ===
- Universitas Esa Unggul
- TK Mutiara Bangsa - elementary school
- Sekolah Citra Islami - private Islamic school
- Sekolah Tarakanita - elementary and high school
- Sekolah Citra Berkat
- Gita Bangsa School - elementary school
- Gita Bangsa School - kindergarten

=== Sports and Recreation ===
- Water World Citra Raya
- World of Wonders Citra Raya- theme park
- Citra Raya Eco Club
- Citra Raya sports club

=== Commerce ===
- ECO Plaza- shopping mall
- Citraraya Food Festival - food park

=== Transportation ===
The township can be reached by Jakarta-Merak Toll Road. Shuttle bus service Trans Citra Raya connects the township with different areas of Jakarta city center.

== See also ==
- Tangerang Regency
- Jabodetabek
