= Naya Nangal =

Town in Punjab, India

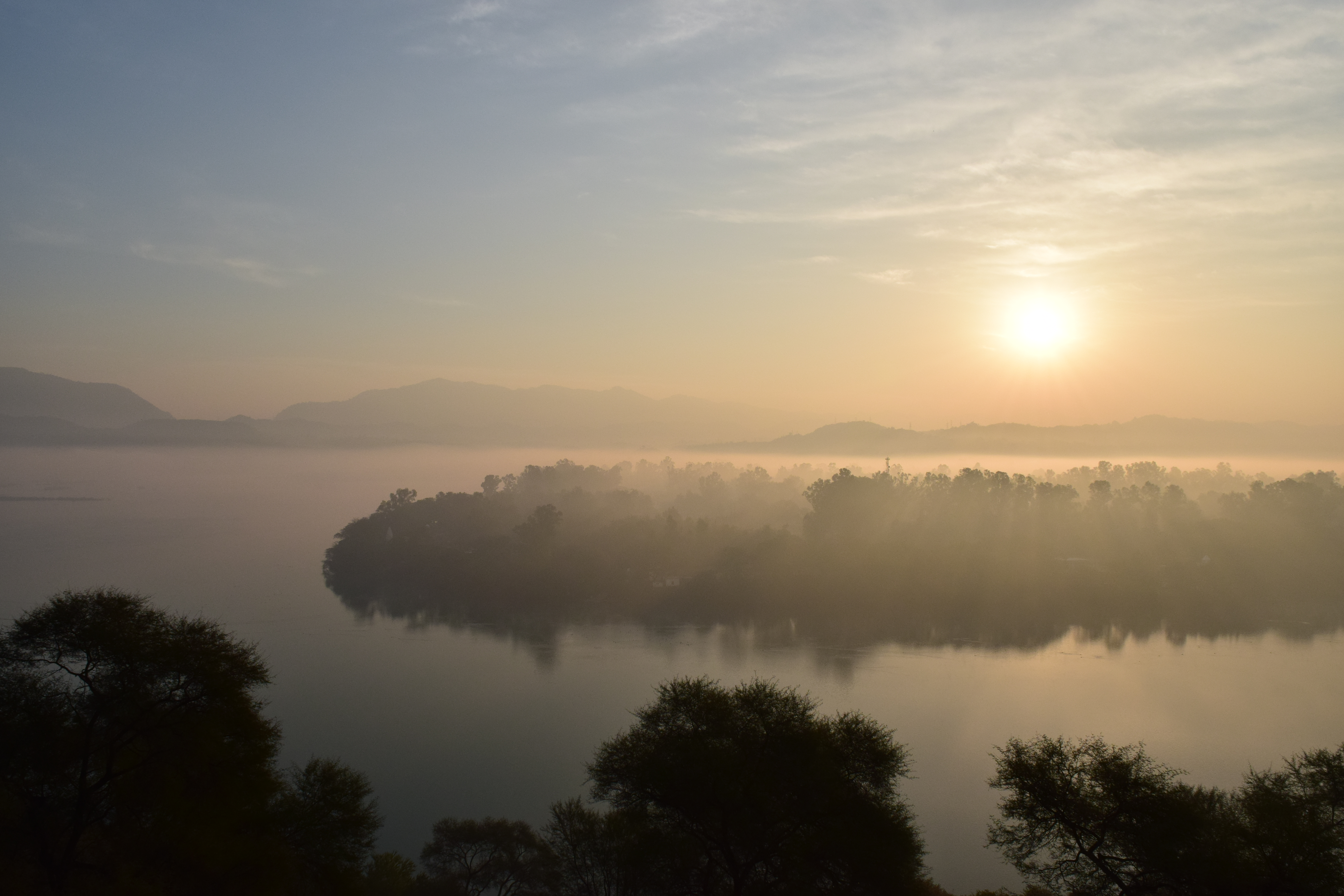
The river Sutlej near Gurudwara Sri Bibhour Sahib in Naya Nangal

Naya Nangal is a town, near Rupnagar city and the Bhakhra Dam in Rupnagar district of Punjab, India. It is part of Nangal, and is a planned town having sectors similar to the city Chandigarh. The town was created for employees of National Fertilizers. It has a railway station and a market divided sector wise. Along with that it covers Shivalik avenue. This town lies on the foothills of Himalayas. It includes the Sutlej River, Nangal Dam, migratory Siberian protected birds, N.F.L. colony, P.A.C.L. colony, ShivaliK Avenue and a history that includes Jawaharlal Nehru visits and British town planning.

== Climate ==
Naya Nangal has been ranked 11th best “National Clean Air City” under (Category 3 population under 3 lakhs cities) in India.
