= Sutter Pointe, California =

Proposed planned community in Sutter County

Sutter Pointe is a proposed planned community in Sutter County, California, approximately 4 miles (6.4 km) north of the City of Sacramento.

Sutter Pointe is the largest development in Sutter County and would accommodate 47,000 to 49,000 people over a 20 to 30-year build-out. The plan calls for 17,500 homes, 20,000 jobs, 3,600 acres (1,500 ha) of employment designated uses, and 1,000 acres (400 ha) of community service uses, which includes parks, schools, open space and other community facilities.

Sutter Pointe was approved by Sutter County Board of Supervisors on June 30, 2009.

Lakeside at Sutter Pointe was approved in November 2020.

Home construction companies that will build in the development include Lennar and Winn Communities.
