= New Akhmim =

New Akhmim أخميم الجديدة
- City

- Location within Egypt
- Coordinates: 26°34′N 31°45′E
- Country: Egypt
- Governorate: Sohag

Area
  - Total: 8.80 sq mi (22.79 km^{2})

Population (2021)
  - Total: 0
  - Density: 0.0/sq mi (0.0/km^{2})
- Time zone: UTC+2 (EGY)
  - Summer (DST): UTC+3 (EEST)

New Akhmim (Arabic: أخميم الجديدة) is a new Egyptian planned city of the third generation cities, located in Sohag, and administratively affiliated to New Urban Communities Authority, Established with the Presidential decree No. 195 of 2000 and edited by the Ministerial decree No. 1623 of 2015.

== History ==
New Akhmim was established with Decree No. 195 of 2000 of the President of the Republic to be a window for Sohag. After that, the planning of the city was edited with Decree No. 1923 of 2015 of ministerial decision. The decision defined the borders of the city which is located at the eastern side of Nile River, at the south-east of Akhmim and from the north-west there is Al Nezyza Valley and St. George Grec Monastery.

== Geography ==
It is 2 km away from the Nile River from the middle and south west, and the north-west border is 1 km away from the River.

== See also ==
- List of cities and towns in Egypt
