= Calambrone =

- Frazione
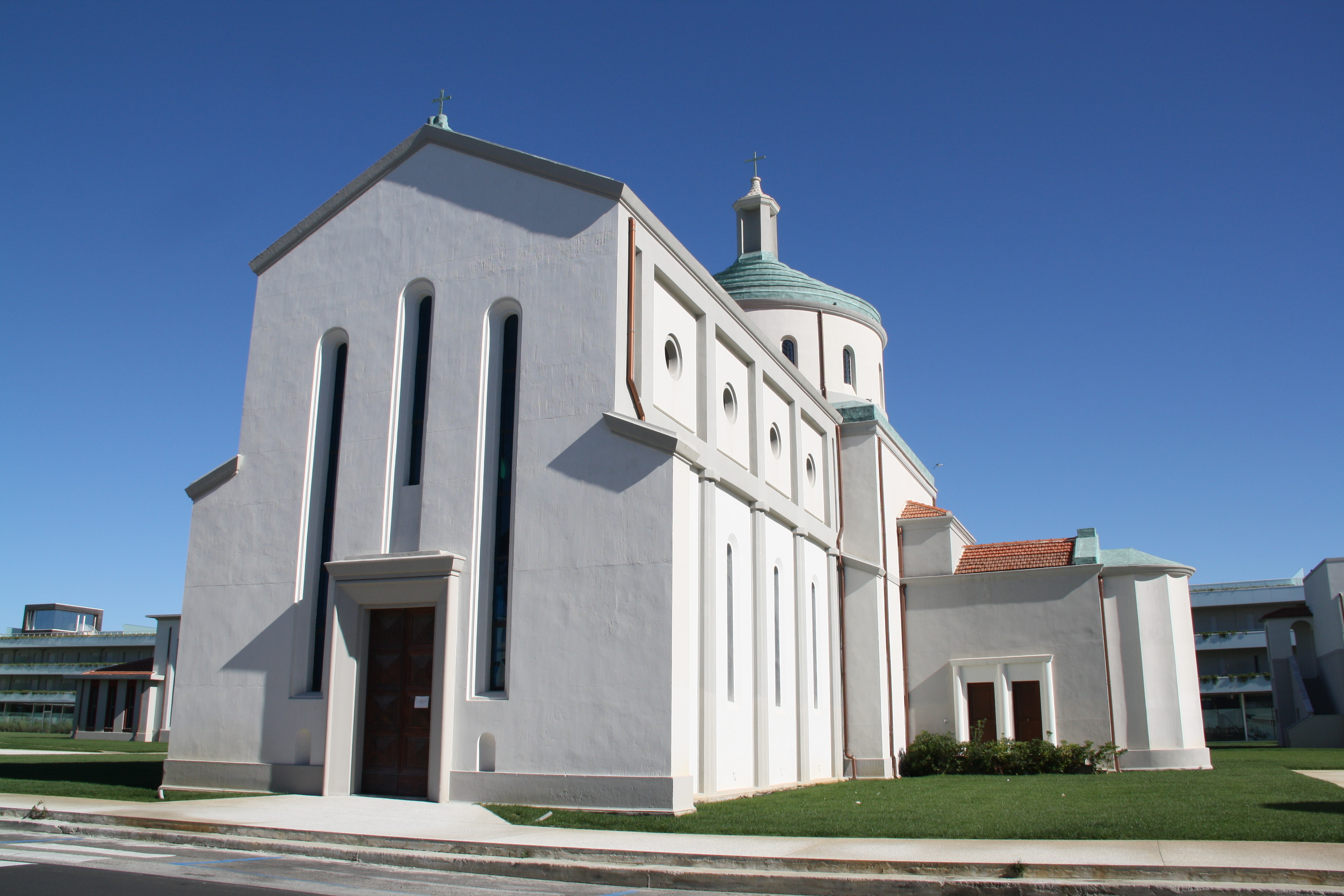
- The church of Santa Rosa in Calambrone

- Location of Calambrone in Italy
- Coordinates: 43°35′49″N 10°17′40″E
- Country: Italy
- Region: Tuscany
- Province: Pisa (PI)
- Comune: Pisa
- Elevation: 3 m (9.8 ft)
- Time zone: UTC+1 (CET)
  - Summer (DST): UTC+2 (CEST)
- Postal code: 56121
- Dialing code: (+39) 050

Calambrone is a village in Tuscany, central Italy, administratively a frazione of the comune of Pisa, province of Pisa.

Calambrone is about 25 km (16 mi) from the city of Pisa.

== Bibliografia ==
- Bani, Ernesto (2003). Calambrone rinasce. Storia e destino di una frazione del litorale pisano. Pisa: ETS.
- Caciagli, Giuseppe (1972). Pisa e la sua provincia. Vol. 3. Pisa: Colombo Cursi Editore. pp. 277–278.
- Meucci, Giuseppe (2014). Storia illustrata di Pisa al mare. Marina, Tirrenia, Calambrone. Pisa: Pacini.
