= Greater Port Harcourt =

- Metropolitan area
- Country: Nigeria
- State: Rivers State

Area
  - Total: 1,900 km^{2} (730 sq mi)

Population (2009)
  - Total: 2,000,000
  - Density: 1,100/km^{2} (2,700/sq mi)
- Time zone: WAT (UTC+1)

Greater Port Harcourt (also called Greater Port Harcourt City) is a metropolitan area currently under construction in Rivers State, Nigeria. It comprises the local government areas of Port Harcourt, Obio-Akpor, Ikwerre, Etche, Eleme and Emohua. It covers an area of approximately 1,900 km² (734 mi²) and as of 2009 had a population of 2 million people making it one of the largest metropolitan areas in Nigeria.

Major plans have been made to build the planned metro area through implementing and enforcing infrastructural development and service delivery policies geared to improving the standard of living and well-being of the people. The key anchors of the new metro area include Port Harcourt International Airport, Port Harcourt City, and Port of Onne.

The Greater Port Harcourt City Development Authority (GPHCDA) was created by law on 2 April 2009 as The Greater Port Harcourt City Development Authority Law No. 2 of 2009. Its mandate is to facilitate the implementation of the Greater Port Harcourt master plan and develop the new metropolitan area.

== History ==
Greater Port Harcourt was originally conceived as a means to cater to the growing population of Port Harcourt metropolis, the increased demand for housing, modern urban amenities, medical and educational facilities, as well as services.

The siting of the project, which was earlier referred to as New Port Harcourt before being officially titled Greater Port Harcourt has leaped the existing dimension of sprawl, changing the dynamics of land space. The area incorporates the entire Port Harcourt (local government area) and portions of Oyigbo, Obio-Akpor, Ikwerre, Etche,Eleme local government area and Emohuas.

Since 1975, there have been intents to develop the Greater Port Harcourt urban centre, although the construction project was not implemented nor was it fully abandoned. In October 2008, the master plan for the development of the metropolitan area was completed. Designed by Arcus GIBB, the plan consisted of two main parts, including renewal of Port Harcourt, and the establishment of a conurbation to help de-densify the original city.

The Greater Port Harcourt City Development Authority was created by law on 2 April 2009 as The Greater Port Harcourt City Development Authority Law No. 2 of 2009. Its primary function is to oversee the implementation of the master plan commencing with the first phase which is split into sections A, B, C and D. Phase 1 layout spans from the Port Harcourt International Airport junction across to Professor Tam David-West Road and extends to part of Igwuruta. This layout comprises clusters of neighbourhoods: low, medium and high densities, mixed use complexes, schools, churches, golf course and estates, internal road networks and storm water drains.

In 2011, Greater Port Harcourt hosted several of the events at the 17th National Sports Festival.

In June 2015, an estimated completion time of 5 years was announced for the first phase of the project.

== Infrastructure ==
Infrastructures which are scheduled to be built include:

- Crime prevention and integrated security system
- 24 hours electricity supply
- Network of reticulated water supply
- Water borne sewage system
- Public transportation system
- Storm water management and disposal system
- Residential neighbourhoods
- Commercial
- Industrial areas, parks and gardens
- 212-hectare (0.82 sq mi) Rivers State University of Science and Technology campus
- 50-hectare (0.19 sq mi) entertainment and sports precinct
- Justice Karibi-Whyte 1,000 bed hospital complex
