= Ciudad Bugambilias =

Gated community in Jalisco, Mexico

- Gated Community
- Fraccionamiento Ciudad Bugambilias
- Seal

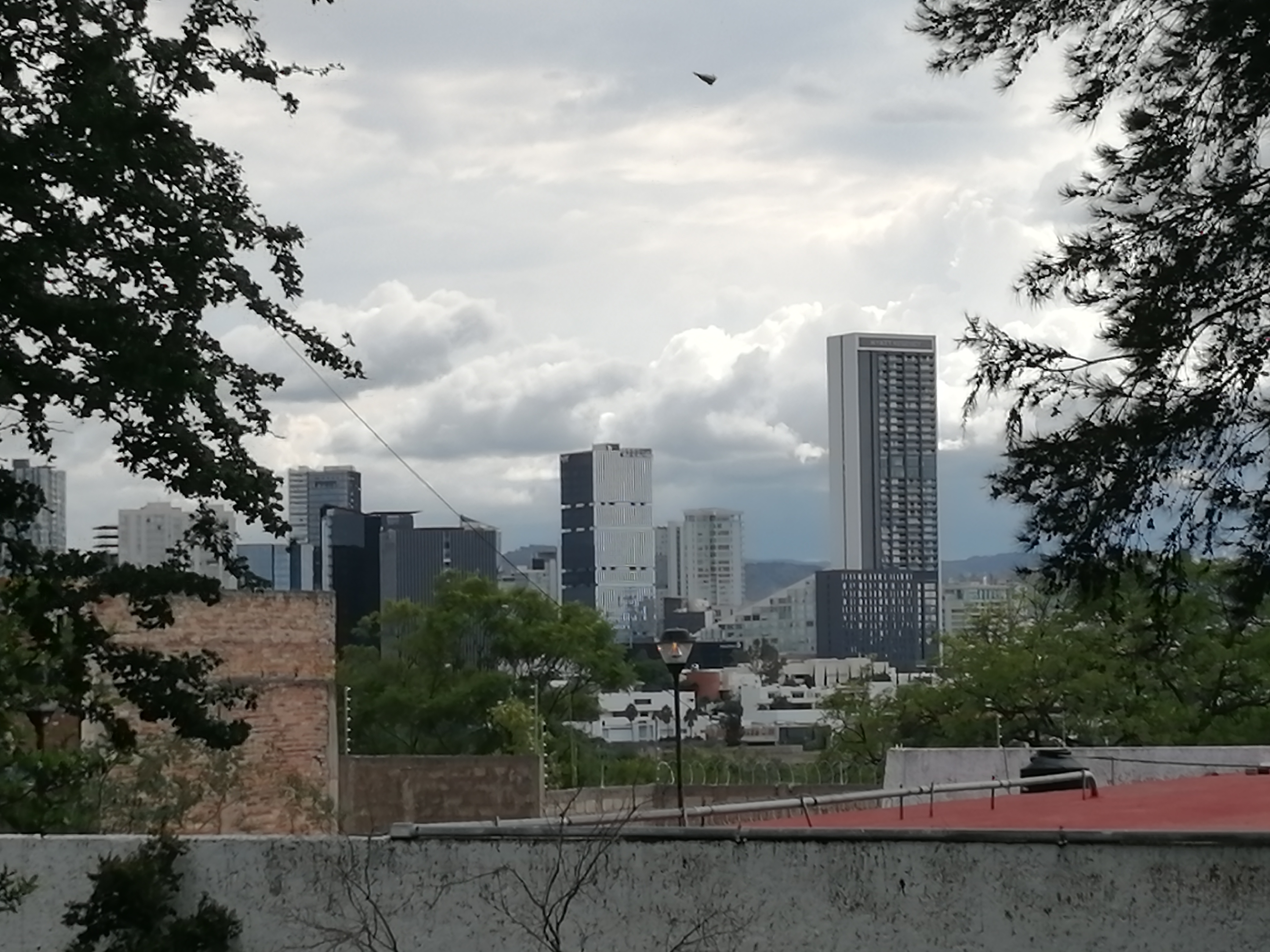

- Location within Mexico
- Coordinates: 20°36′07″N 103°26′49″W
- Country: Mexico
- State: Jalisco
- City: Zapopan

Government
  - Body: Asociación de Colonos de Ciudad Bugambilias A.C.
- Highest elevation (Second Section, Panoramic): 1,850 m (6,070 ft)
- Lowest elevation (First Section, Jardines): 1,647 m (5,404 ft)
- Postcodes: 45237, 45238

Ciudad Bugambilias (Guadalajara, Mexico) (Spanish pronunciation: [sjuˈðað βuɣãmˈbiljas]) is an exclusive residential gated neighborhood, located in the municipality of Zapopan, part of the metropolitan zone of Guadalajara in the state of Jalisco, Mexico.

Established in 1975. It was one of the first neighborhoods developed towards the south of the city focusing on green communal areas, enclosed by the polygon forestal protected area Cerro del Tajo and part of the Primavera Forest.

It is known to be home to many high-net-worth individuals and affluent established families of the country.

Its main entrance is located via Avenida López Mateos.

The area is currently monitored by a new system of surveillance C5 introduced in partnership with the state and private police.

== Geography ==
Divided into two sections, the first located at the bottom of the forest plateau and the second on the hill directly next to the forest and overseeing the city. The second panoramic section has the best air quality compared to the rest of the city due to its proximity to the forest.

Green areas are currently protected restricting construction due to their ecological importance and biodiversity since 2018 by the INAH (National Institute of Archaeology and History), SEMARNAT (Secretariat of Environment and Natural Resources), SCT (Secretaríat de Communications and Transport), and government of the state of Jalisco.

== Education ==
=== Private schools include ===
- Cumbres International School Guadalajara (Legionaries of Christ)
- Instituto Alpes Bugambilias (Legionaries of Christ)
- Instituto DaVinci Talentos (Preschool)

== Economy ==
=== Shopping malls ===
- Plaza Bugambilias
- Plaza Panorámica Bugambilias

=== Private Clubs ===
- Bugambilias Club

== See also ==
- Zapopan
- Guadalajara
- Guadalajara Metropolitan Area
