= New Thebes =

New Thebes طيبه الجديده
- City
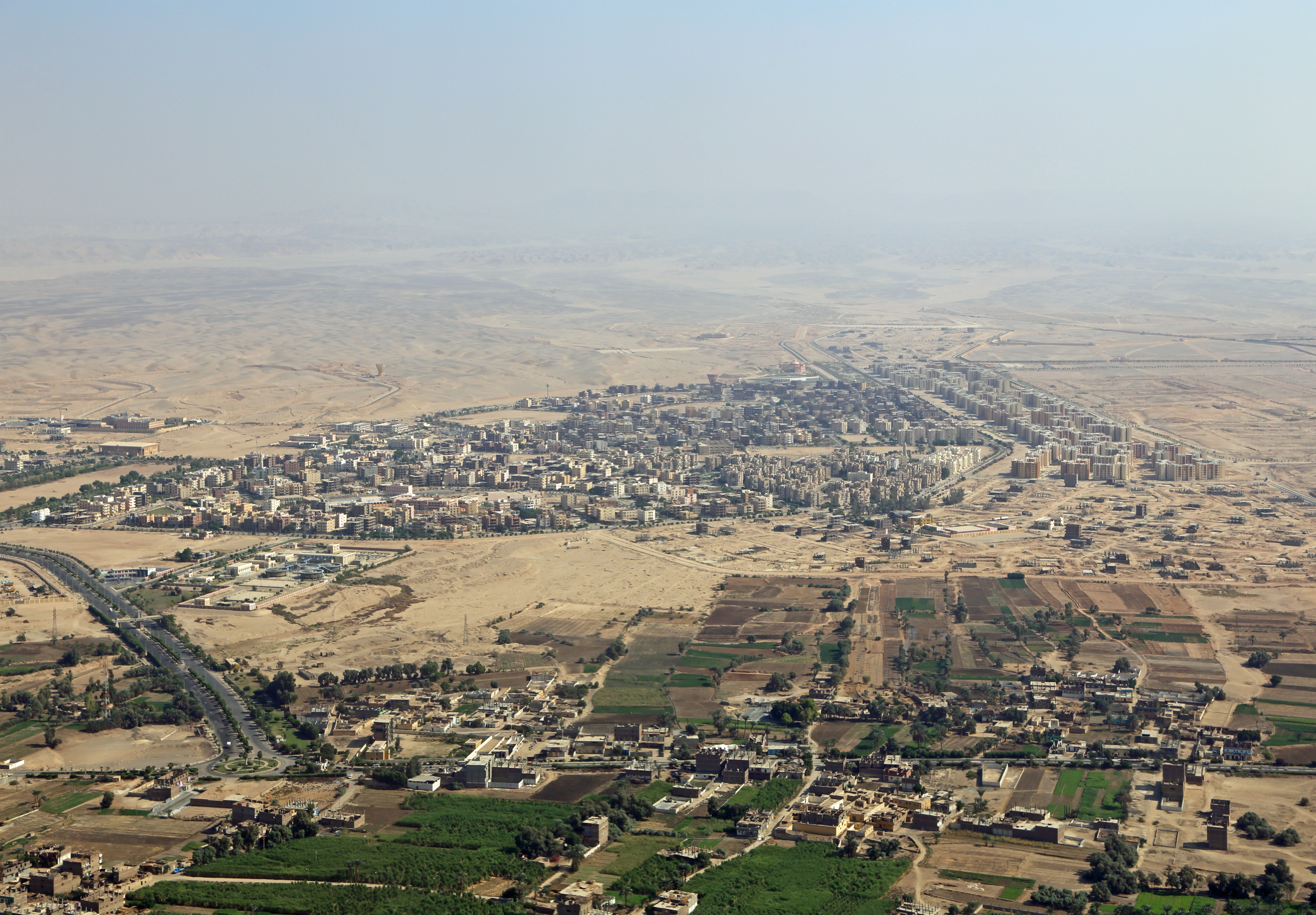
- Aerial view

- Location in Egypt
- Coordinates: 25.681137°N 32.721176°E
- Country: Egypt
- Governorate: Luxor
- Established: 2000
- Founder: Government of Egypt

Government
  - Chairman: Radwan Abel Rashid

Area
  - Total: 3,883 ha (9,594 acres)
  - Urban: 3,463 ha (8,557 acres)
- Time zone: UTC+2 (EST)

New Thebes (Egyptian Arabic: طيبة الجديدة) is a city in Luxor Governorate, Egypt. A third-generation city, it was established in 2000. The city is located 14 kilometers northeast of the city of Luxor and 10 kilometers from Luxor International Airport.

The city's total area is 9,594 acres, with the current urban area covering 8,557 acres. A detailed plan for an additional 6,050 acres was approved by Ministerial Decree No. 239, dated April 26, 2020.

== Infrastructure ==
A drinking water treatment plant with a capacity of 35,000 m³/day was constructed in two phases. A wastewater treatment plant with a capacity of 9,000 m³/day was constructed in two phases and is currently being upgraded to a tertiary treatment facility for use in irrigating green spaces within the urban area. The first phase of the city's wastewater treatment plant, with a capacity of 5,000 m³/day out of a total capacity of 20,000 m³/day, has been completed.

=== Roads ===
Construction is underway to complete the city's wastewater treatment plant, with a capacity of 15,000 m³/day out of a total capacity of 20,000 m³/day. A road network spanning 138 km has been constructed. A 50 MVA transformer station was constructed. An industrial zone of 382 acres was planned, comprising 655 plots of land ranging in size from 300 to 7200 m².

=== Education ===
==== Luxor University ====
The university campus in the city of Thebes covers 100 acres and includes:

- Faculty of Science
- Faculty of Education
- The Faculty of Medicine.
- Luxor University Hospital.
- Faculty of Computing and Information
- College of Fine Arts
- College of Al-Alsun
- Faculty of Archaeology
- Faculty of Tourism and Hotels
- College of Nursing

==== Misr University of Science and Technology ====
Misr University of Science and Technology acquired a 44-acre plot of land in the city after submitting an allocation request to the New Urban Communities Authority to establish a branch in Upper Egypt. The university plans to establish 10 colleges at its planned branch, reflecting its focus on expanding into new urban centers.

The branch will include the following colleges: Medicine and Dentistry, Physical Therapy, Nursing, Health Sciences Technology, Pharmacy, Special Education, Engineering, Information Technology, Management and Economics, Languages and Translation, Media and Communication Arts, Archaeological Site Management and Museum Studies, and Biotechnology.

==== Thebes Technological University ====
The university includes 3 chemistry labs in addition to computer labs, 4 carpentry workshops, 4 classrooms, 4 lecture halls, 5 five-a-side and multi-purpose sports fields, a teaching hotel, and other facilities.

The university has also student dormitories for male and female students, and faculty housing. Students receive a Higher Technological Diploma and a Bachelor of Technology degree in any of its specializations. The university also grants professional Master's and PhD in technology. Studies at the university began in September 2022.

=== Healthcare ===
==== Shefaa Al-Orman Hospital ====
It is a free cancer treatment hospital is the first and largest integrated hospital in Upper Egypt offering completely free cancer treatment. The hospital is equipped with diagnostic and treatment equipment for cancer patients and serves residents of the southern governorates of Upper Egypt. The hospital includes outpatient clinics for daily patient checkups, a day-care unit with chemotherapy beds accommodating approximately 200 patients daily throughout the week, and a radiotherapy department equipped with a simulator for CT scans to pinpoint the treatment area.

The hospital also includes a radiotherapy unit for chemotherapy with 45 beds, including all kinds of therapy. The hospital also includes laboratories, and a guest house for patients inside it. There are various radiology devices, in addition to a nuclear medicine unit, clinical pharmacy department, day-care unit pharmacist, and also an outpatient unit pharmacist.
