= Yokohl Ranch, California =

Yokohl Ranch, California was a proposed 36,000-acre (15,000 ha) town in an unincorporated area of Tulare County, California. It would have been located in the Sierra Nevada foothills, 15 miles (24 km) east of Visalia and 30 miles west of Sequoia National Park. The J.G. Boswell Company (Yokohl Ranch Company LLC) would have developed the new town in phases over 25 to 30 years if approved, but was eventually foiled.

The Yokohl Ranch Proposal included a mixed-use Town Center, healthcare facilities, 10,000 homes for 30,000 people, new public schools, fire and police stations, resort lodge, 3 golf courses, a water reclamation plant, reservoir, recreation center, parks, trails, and employment center. Approximately 70% of the land would have remained undeveloped.
