= Senboku New Town =

- Neighborhood
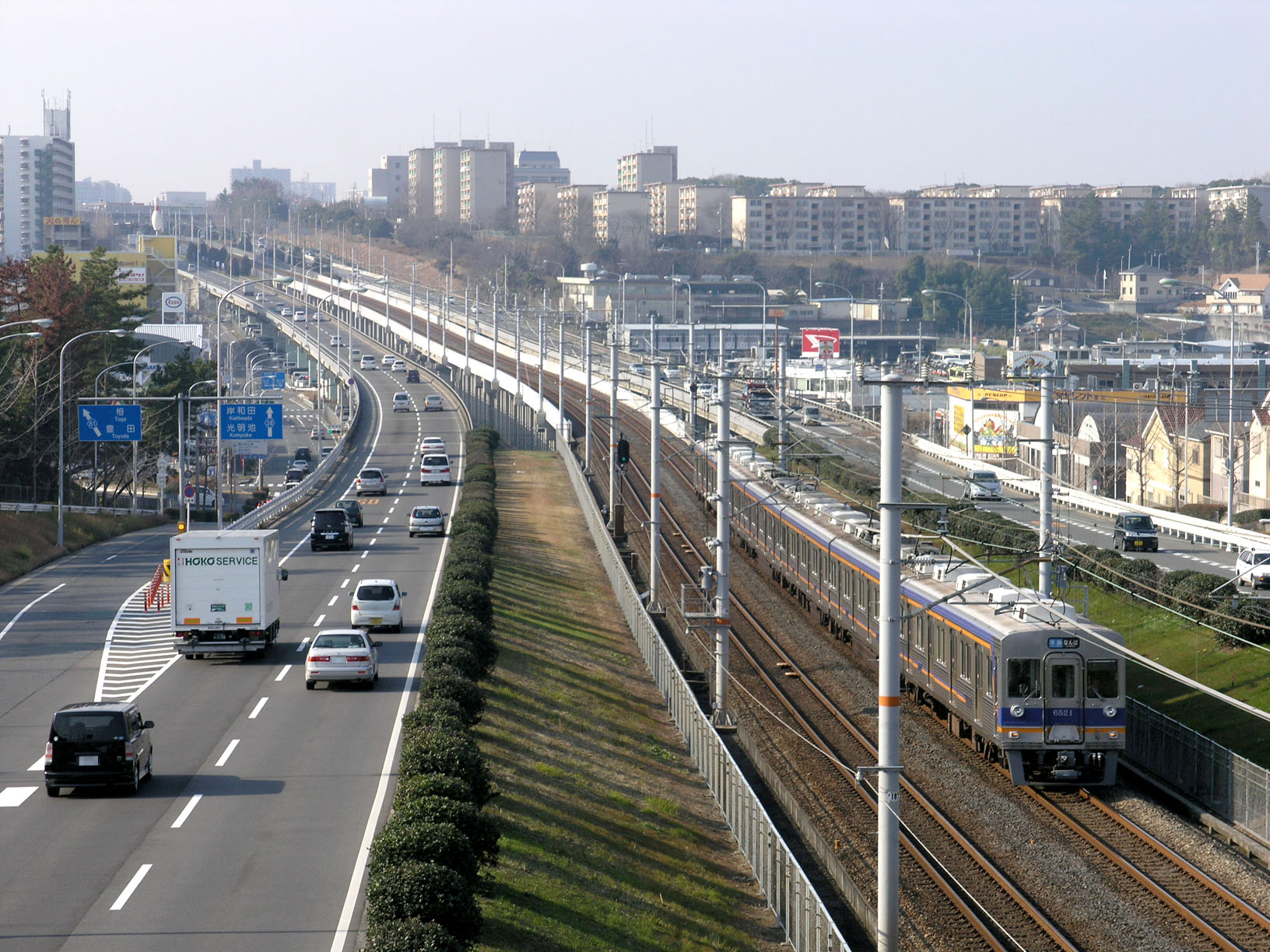
- Semboku Rapid Railway running through Senboku New Town
- Country: Japan
- Prefecture: Osaka Prefecture
- City: Sakai City; Izumi City
- Development period: December 1965 - March 1983 developed by Osaka Prefectural Enterprise Bureau
- Named for: Northern part of Izumi Province

Population (Japan Resident Registry)
  - Total: Sakai City area 116,367 （December 2,021）

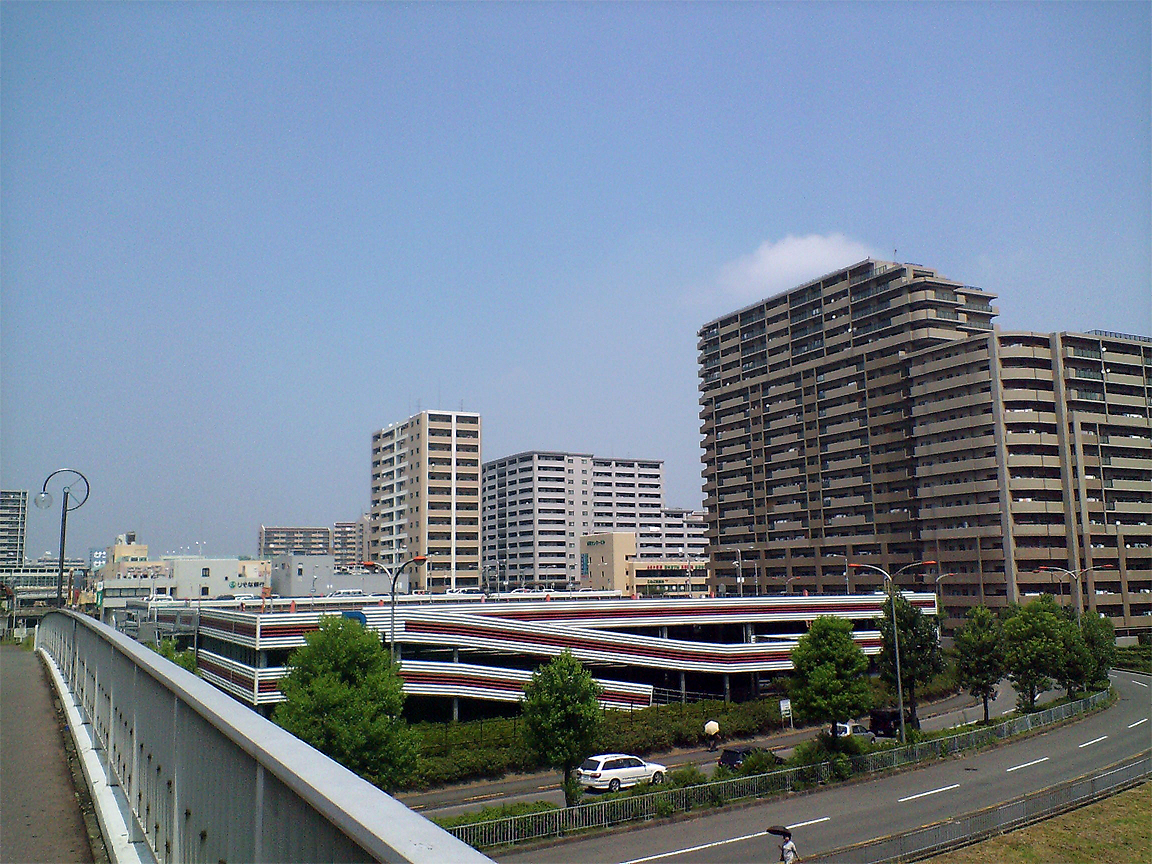
Senboku New Town (PHOTO 1) in Sakai City, Osaka, Japan

Senboku New Town (泉北ニュータウン, Senboku Nyū Taun) is an area in the Minami Ward of Sakai, Osaka and Izumi, Osaka, Japan. With an area of 1,557 hectares, its population is about 150,000. Sections of the New Town include Izumigaoka (population about 67,000), Toga (population about 39,000) and Komyoike (population about 36,000). The area is served by the Semboku Rapid Railway.
