= New Qena =

New Qena قنا الجديدة
- Planned city
- Seal

- Location in Egypt
- Coordinates: 26.235°N 32.74°E
- Country: Egypt
- Governorate: Qena
- Founded: 2000

Government
  - Head of New Qena City Authority: Mustafa Saeed

Area
  - Total: 97.934 km^{2} (37.813 sq mi)

Population (Target Population)
  - Total: 130,000
  - Density: 1,300/km^{2} (3,400/sq mi)
- Time zone: UTC+2 (EET)
  - Summer (DST): UTC+3 (EEST)
- Postal code: 83511
- Area code: +20 (96)

New Qena (Egyptian Arabic: قنا الجديدة) is a city in the Qena Governorate, Egypt. It was established by Presidential Decree 197/2000 as part of the NUCA New Cities program as a Third Generation city. The total cost of the planned city is E£ 3 billion and it will house 130,000 people.

The city's total area is 24,200 acres, but the urban area only covers approximately 7,000 acres and is located in the northwest area of the city. There are a total of 6,068 housing units planned, of which 5,078 are currently built, as of February 2023. Construction of a E£ 152.9 million dollar hospital is also underway, which when finished will be 8 floors and have 175 beds.
