= New Damietta =

New Damietta مدينة دمياط الجديدة
- City
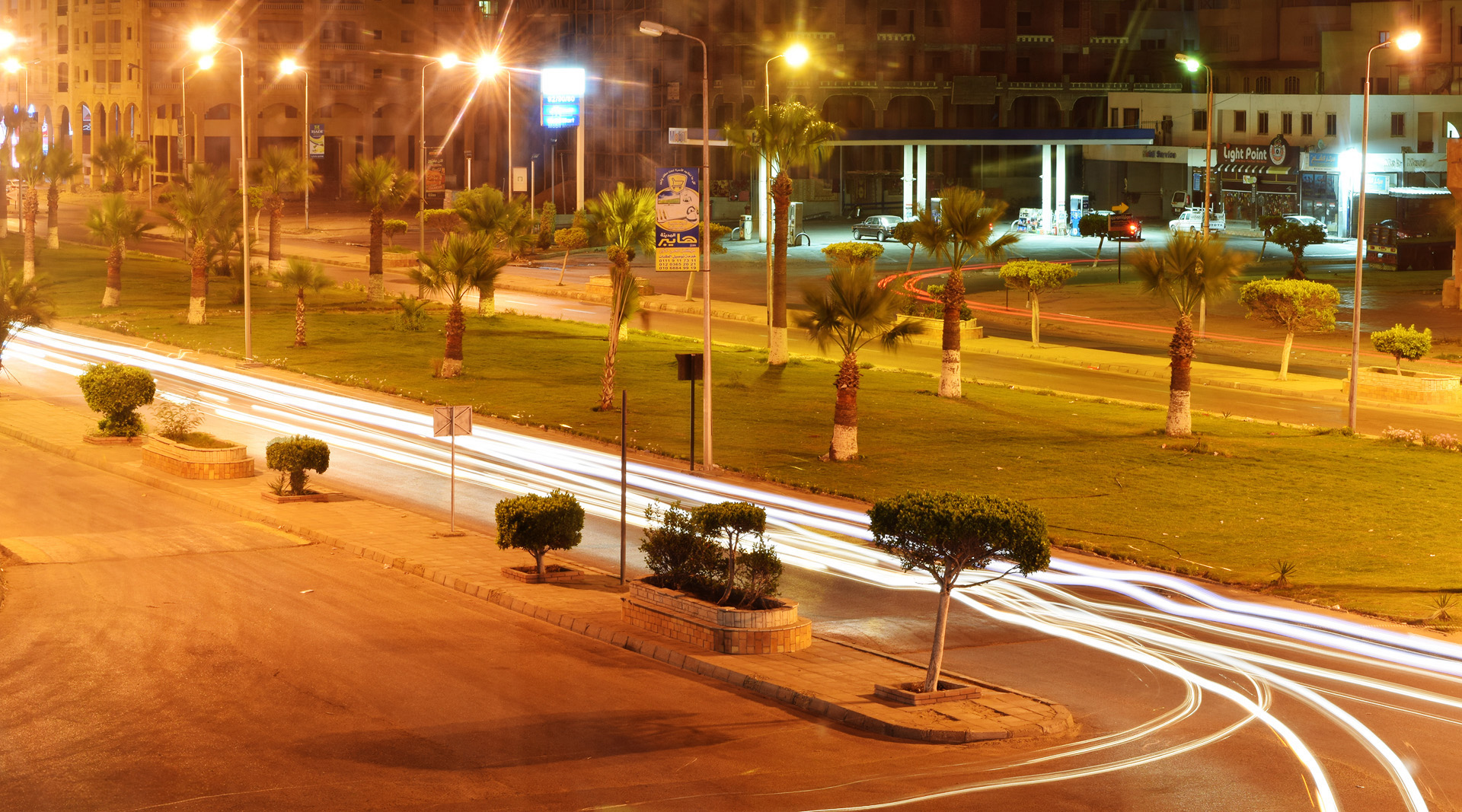
- Panoramic view of New Damietta

- Location in Egypt
- Coordinates: 31.4368°N 31.667°E
- Country: Egypt
- Governorate: Damietta
- Founded: 1980
- Founder: New Urban Communities Authority

Government
  - Head of the City Authority: Muhammad Abdel-Majid

Area
  - Total: 43.96 km^{2} (16.97 sq mi)

Population (2023)
  - Total: 55,434
  - Density: 1,261/km^{2} (3,266/sq mi)
- Time zone: UTC+2 (EET)
  - Summer (DST): UTC+3 (EEST)
- Postal code: 34517
- Area code: (+20) 57
- Website: www.newdamietta.gov.eg

New Damietta (Egyptian Arabic: مدينة دمياط الجديدة) is a city in the Damietta Governorate, Egypt. Situated along the coast of the Mediterranean Sea, the city was established in 1980 by the New Urban Communities Authority. As of 2023, it has a population of approximately 55,434 people. New Damietta covers an area of 43.96 square kilometers.

== Geography and governance ==
New Damietta covers an area of 43.96 square kilometers.

The city operates under the governance of the New Damietta Municipality.

== Administration ==
Main Areas in New Damietta comprises several distinct districts, each serving different purposes:

- Central Area: Includes key authorities, hospitals, a stadium, electricity company, the central park, and more.
- First District: Encompasses local shopping centers, schools, and the Azhar Hospital.
- Second District: Contains clubs and colleges.
- Third District: Primarily residential houses.
- Fourth District: Features several schools.
- Fifth District: Home to special residential houses.
- Dar Masr: A compound consisting of two main sites, enclosed by an iron fence.

== Cityscape ==
New Damietta boasts several key features, including approximately 23,700 residential buildings constructed by the New Damietta Reconstruction and Housing Authority. The city also includes approximately 7,272 apartments across 303 buildings in Dar Masr compounds, along with approximately 44 apartment buildings in Jannat Masr compounds. Various other buildings, including those managed by Egypt Housing, contribute to the city's infrastructure.

=== Real estate and housing ===
- Dar Masr and Jannat Masr compounds offering residential apartments.
- Industrial area housing approximately 600 factories.
- Central Park, Alcazaba, and other recreational facilities.
- Egypt Public Library in the fourth neighborhood.
- Central Park in the central area, adjacent to the city's development agency.
- Smart Village, an extension of the chalet area.
- Future Club in the second neighborhood.
- Damietta Container Club in the second neighborhood.
- Traders Club in the second neighborhood.
- Palace of Culture.

== Economy ==
The city allocates its resources across various sectors, with approximately 2,200 million EGP allocated to the residential sector, 281.8 million EGP to services, 2,700 million EGP to utilities, and 58 million EGP to the agricultural sector.

Additionally, the city boasts an industrial area located in the southeast, housing approximately 600 factories. Notable thoroughfares include Al-Kafrawy's Street (also known as Al-Saedi's Street).

New Damietta is home to several banking services provided by various banks, including; Housing and Development Bank in the first neighborhood, adjacent to the first neighborhood, Bank Misr in the second neighborhood, near the city police department, National Bank of Egypt in the second neighborhood, near the central police department, Faisal Islamic Egyptian Bank, Banque du Caire (near the medical center), and Commercial International Bank (CIB) in the central area.

== Infrastructure ==
New Damietta

=== Education ===
The city is home to several educational institutions, including:

- Al-Azhar University branches offering various faculties.
- Model institutes and elementary schools catering to primary, preparatory, and high school education.
- Islamic Center for Medical Studies and Research affiliated with the Faculty of Medicine, Al-Azhar University.
- Al-Khulafa Al-Rashideen Model Institute for Boys (primary/preparatory/high school).
- Noor Al-Islam Model Institute for Girls (primary/preparatory/high school).
- Al-Madinah Al-Munawarah Model Institute for Girls (primary/preparatory/high school).
- Damietta University, which includes faculties of medicine, engineering, education, special education, physical education, applied arts, commerce, science, agriculture, and literature.
- Six elementary schools in the first and second neighborhoods, along with four general high schools in the first and second neighborhoods (Dr. Ali Musharfa School, Khalid ibn Al-Walid School, Abu Bakr Al-Siddiq School, Omar ibn Abdulaziz School), as well as a joint industrial school and Mubarak Cool Industrial School. Additionally, there is Al-Kafrawy Allah School (regular/language) and Ali ibn Abi Talib School and Future School.
- Riyadh As-Saleheen School (primary/preparatory/high school).

=== Healthcare ===
New Damietta provides healthcare services through various facilities, including:

- Public medical centers.
- New Damietta Military Hospital.
- Al-Azhar University Hospital.
- Ambulance unit in the industrial area.
- International Eye Hospital.

== See also ==
- List of cities in Egypt
