= New Kanpur City =

- city
- Nickname: NKC
- Location in Uttar Pradesh, India
- Coordinates: 26.6127°N 80.2719°E
- Country: India
- State: Uttar Pradesh
- District: Kanpur Nagar
- Established: 1998

Government
  - Body: Kanpur Development Authority

Area
  - Total: 40.46856 km^{2} (15.62500 sq mi)

Languages
  - Official: Hindi
- Time zone: UTC+5:30 (IST)
- PIN: 208028-30
- Telephone code: 0512
- Vehicle registration: UP-78

New Kanpur City is a satellite city of Kanpur, India. The new city spreads over 10,000 acres of prime land on the banks of the Ganges. Co-operative housing societies will get preference for allotment of plots in this new city. The remaining land will be allotted to the private developers with the clause that they will develop houses covering minimum 25 per cent of the plot area.

== Land Proposed ==
Over 10,000 acres of land is proposed for New Kanpur City Between Bithoor and Azad Nagar on a 4 lane Road Kanpur-Bithoor Road or Mainawati Marg.

== Economy ==
Various IT Firms and Multi National Companies have been invited by Uttar Pradesh government to set up their regional offices in Kanpur and Lucknow. There is a strong potential of New Kanpur City being developed as IT neighbourhood of Kanpur in coming years as it is in close proximity to IIT-Kanpur and Kanpur University. The place is also ideal for the Multi National Companies as the weather in the region of North West Kanpur is pleasant as compared.to other regions. The Agra Lucknow Expressway is also in close proximity from the region which makes it easier for the residents to travel to Delhi and Agra. Beside, there has been a proposal of setting up a large international airport on the road to Kannauj from Kanpur which is in close proximity from the region. Railways have also extended their connectivity to Bithoor via New Kanpur City and there have been plans to operate rail services from Bithoor to Delhi via Kanpur Anwarganj railway station, Govindpuri railway station and Panki railway station on Howrah-Delhi main line.

== Transportation ==
=== Kanpur Metro ===
Kanpur Metro Rail shall be extended to New Kanpur en route to Bithoor. The Blue Line which is proposed from Barra-8 to Agriculture University shall be extended to Bithoor and have various metro stations in New Kanpur City.

=== City Bus ===
City Buses of Kanpur Metropolitan Bus Service from Kanpur Central railway station, Ganesh Shankar Vidyarthi Airport, Panki railway station, Govindpuri railway station, Mandhana Junction railway station, Jajmau and Kanpur Anwarganj railway station to Bithoor will run via New Kanpur City.

== Education ==
Kanpur Development Authority has planned to set up a large medical university, engineering and skill development Institutes in New Kanpur City. Apart from that Film Institute is also proposed to be built up here.

== See also ==
- Kanpur
- Bithur
