= Ras El Hekma =

Ras El Hekma راس الحكمة Ras el-Hekma, Ras el-Hikma
- Village
- Location in Egypt
- Coordinates: 31°13′N 27°51′E
- Country: Egypt
- Governorate: Matruh
- Time zone: UTC+2 (EET)
  - Summer (DST): UTC+3 (EEST)
- Website: https://rasalhekma.com

Ras El Hekma (Arabic: راس الحكمة) is a Bedouin village on the coast of the Mediterranean Sea in Egypt.

== Overview ==
Ras El Hekma is a coastal region located on a cape along Egypt's Mediterranean shoreline, in the Western Desert. It lies approximately 70 km east of Mersa Matruh and 200 km west of Alexandria. The area is known for its agricultural production, accounting for 17 percent of Egypt's olive output and 26 percent of its fig production.

In 2024, Egypt's New Urban Communities Authority signed an agreement with the Abu Dhabi Developmental Holding Company (ADQ), a sovereign wealth fund of the United Arab Emirates, for a US$35 billion development project in the area. The agreement grants ADQ development rights over approximately 130 million square metres of land and represents the largest foreign direct investment in Egypt's history.

The project has drawn scrutiny over its implications for Egypt’s public debt and the displacement of local communities. Abu Dhabi-based Modon Holding PSC has been appointed as the lead developer of the project.

The planned city is to be divided into 11 districts: Eastern Gate, Sun Gate, White Hill, Design District, Tribal City, Wisdom Island, Fig Valley, Old District, Turtle Beach, the Gulf, and Western Gate. The development is intended to incorporate elements of traditional Bedouin architectural style.
