= New Asyut =

New Asyut أسيوط الجديدة
- City
- Location in Egypt
- Coordinates: 27.1°N 31.1°E
- Country: Egypt
- Governorate: Asyut

Area
  - Total: 9.713 km^{2} (3.750 sq mi)

Population (2021)
  - Total: 9,228
  - Density: 950.1/km^{2} (2,461/sq mi)
- Time zone: UTC+2 (EET)
  - Summer (DST): UTC+3 (EEST)

New Asyut (Arabic: أسيوط الجديدة) is a city in Asyut Governorate, Egypt. It was established in 2000.

== See also ==
- List of cities and towns in Egypt
- New Nasser City
