= Jonathan, Minnesota =

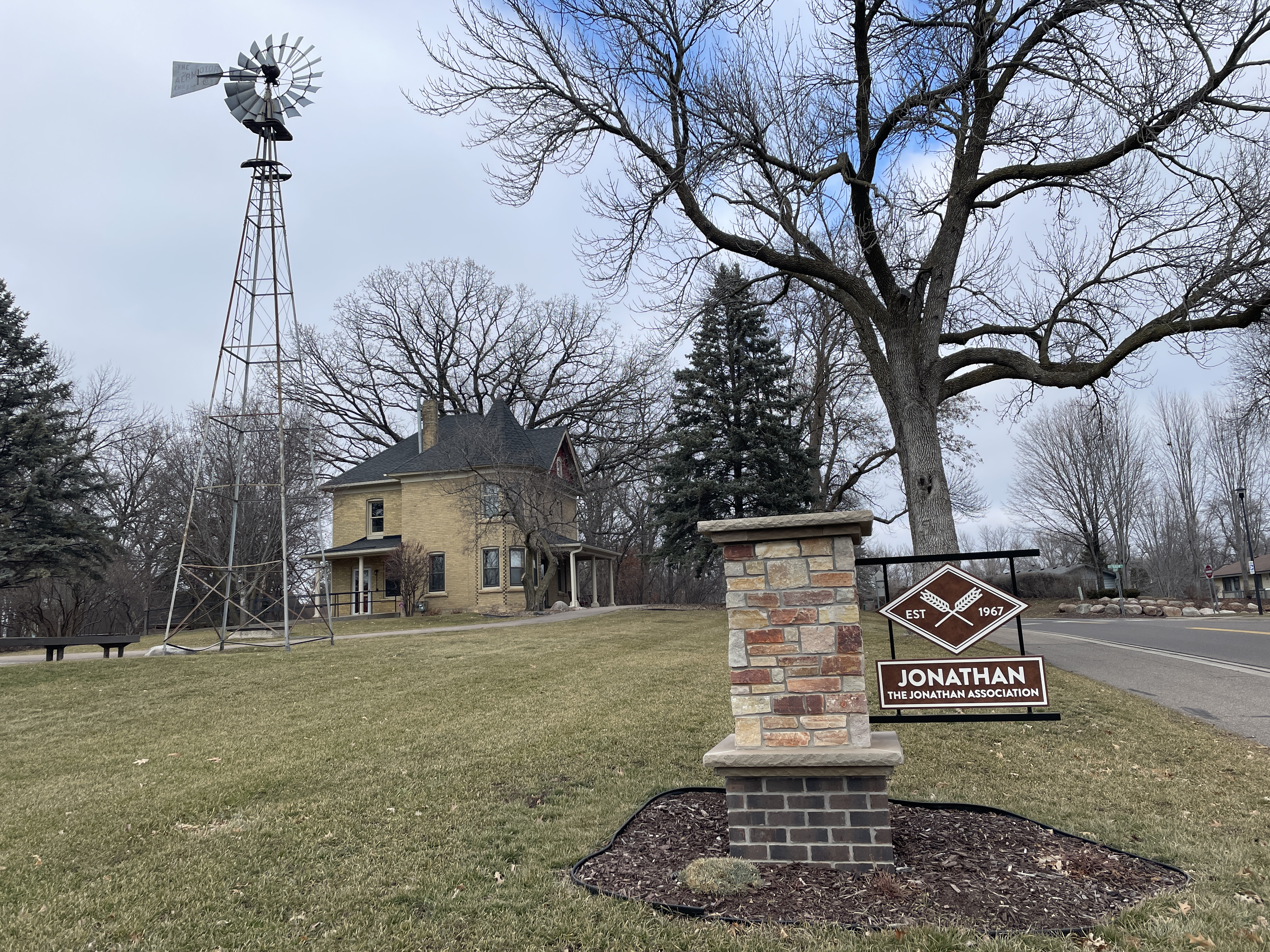
The Karen House was constructed in 1904 and the house and nearby land was bought to develop Jonathan.

Jonathan, Minnesota is a homeowners' association that is a remnant of a planned community development within the city of Chaska, Minnesota in Carver County. It was named for Jonathan Carver, for whom Carver County also is named. In 2008, it is the largest homeowners' association in the State of Minnesota, with 2,300 households. It was planned by the Jonathan Development Corporation and begun in 1967. It was the idea of Minnesota State Senator and real estate developer Henry T. McKnight. The planners chose a site outside the Twin Cities urban area and Interstate 494/694 belt line. The town site was centered on the intersection of Minnesota State Highway 41 and the Pacific Extension of the Chicago, Milwaukee, St. Paul and Pacific Railroad.

== History ==
A large single town center was envisioned to straddle the railway between McKnight Lake and Jonathan Lake, and have shops, businesses and higher density housing. Surrounding the center were to have been smaller villages. It was expected to have a total population of 50,000 by the 1980s.

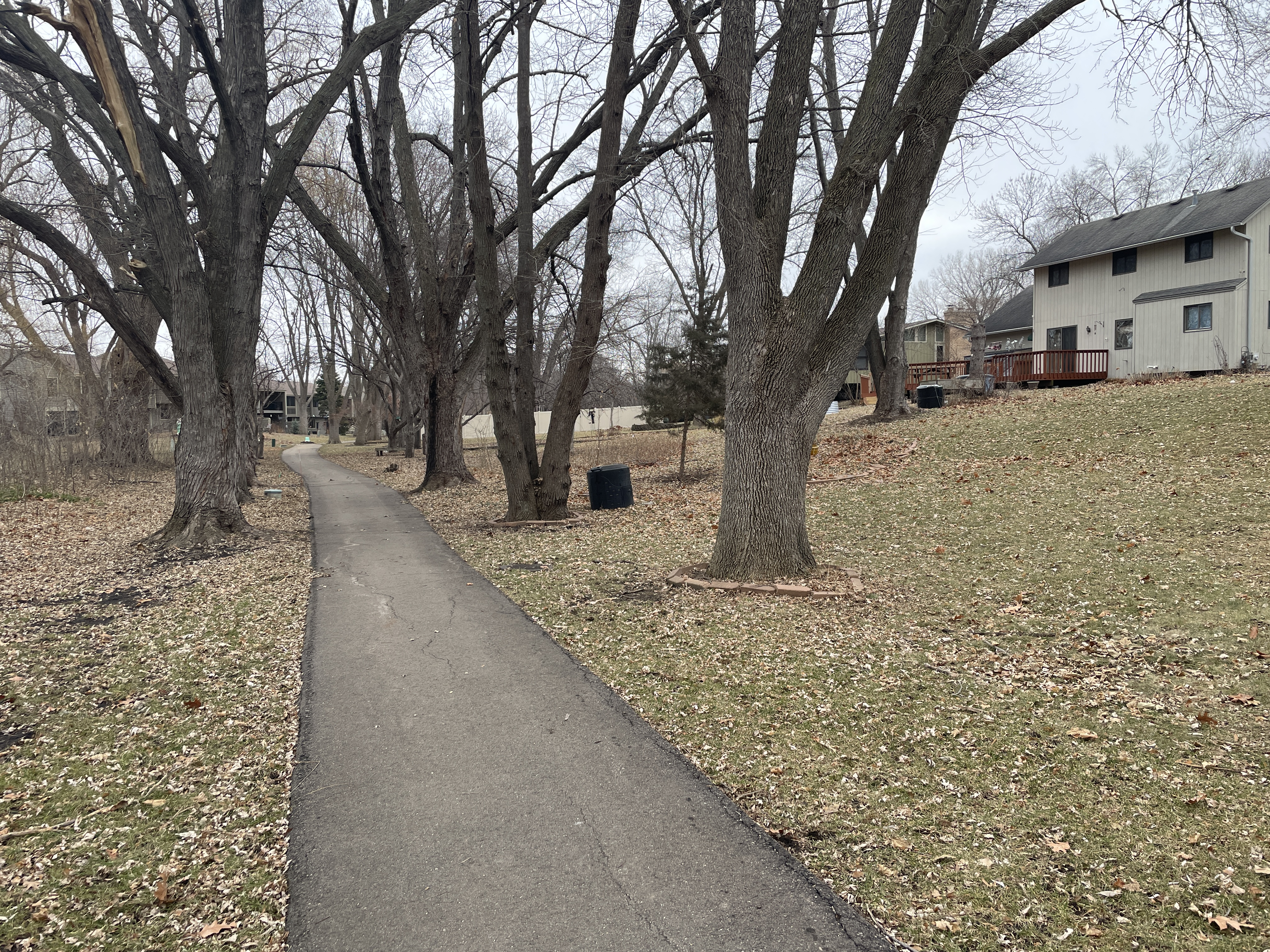
A series of off-street footpaths connects neighborhoods of Jonathan, Minnesota.

In 1970, Jonathan became the first new town in the United States to receive a guarantee of financial assistance from federal government as part of Title IV of the Housing and Urban Development act of 1968.

In 1971, Jonathan hosted the very first Minnesota Renaissance Festival, then known as the Minnesota Renaissance Fair and promoted as "A Celebration of Nature, Art, and Life!" It would later move to nearby Shakopee, and grow into one of the largest Renaissance Fairs in the nation.

The development corporation folded in 1979, and Jonathan was annexed by the city of Chaska.

Between 2005 and 2007, a majority of the Jonathan Association Board of Directors supported an effort to break up the homeowner Association by allowing some neighborhoods to leave. In October 2007, the majority of the board members voted to go to court for a declaratory judgment as to whether or not neighborhoods brought into the association after the 1979 demise of the Jonathan Development Corporation were annexed properly. In February 2008, six (6) of the nine seated board members, all of which supported seeking a declaratory judgement were voted out of office at the Association's Annual Meeting.

== Personnel ==
Minnesota State Senator and real estate developer Henry T. McKnight was the chief executive. Chaska resident Julius C. "Jules" Smith served as counsel during the development and later served on the Metropolitan Council. Current Chaska city council member Robert J. ("Bob") Lindall was the president of the Jonathan Development Corporation from 1974 through 1979. Other board members included J. F. Deckenbach, Lewis Krohn, J. Kimball Whitney, Mandell L. Berman, Robert J. Dahlin, Ben C. Cunningham, Duane E. Joseph, and H. Richard Korsh.

== Bibliography ==
- Downie, Leonard (Jr.) - The Midwest: An Unlikely Laboratory for New Towns. The Alicia Patterson Fund. September 27, 1971
- Hawkins, Beth - Arrested Development - How Minnesota philanthropist and developer Henry McKnight's utopian vision of suburbia became a blueprint for modern exurban nightmares. Citypages. July 13, 2005
- Martin, Frank Edgerton (Jr.) - Although Chaska's 'new town' development failed, it transformed how we live. Star Tribune. June 18, 2016
- Pub. L. 90-448, title IV, Aug. 1, 1968. NEW COMMUNITIES ACT OF 1968 (Housing and Urban Development Act of 1968) - GUARANTEES FOR FINANCING NEW COMMUNITY LAND DEVELOPMENT. United States Department of Housing and Urban Development
- Saylor, Thomas - Jonathan: Planned City of Tomorrow. Minnesota History. Fall 2013
- Sturdevant, Andy - 'Ex-town' Jonathan still has distinct touches of its futuristic beginnings. MinnPost. May 30, 2012
