= Chobepur =

Chaubepur
- suburb
- Location in Uttar Pradesh, India
- Coordinates: 26.371165°N 80.112294°E
- Country: India
- State: Uttar Pradesh
- District: Kanpur Nagar

Government
  - Type: BJP
- Elevation: 133 m (436 ft)

Population
  - Total: 4,000

Languages
  - Official: Hindi
- Time zone: UTC+5:30 (IST)
- PIN: 209203
- Vehicle registration: UP-78
- Nearest city Or Town: Mandhana, Shivrajpur(Barrajpur)
- Literacy: 85%
- Lok Sabha constituency: Bilhaur
- Vidhan Sabha constituency: Chaubepur

Chaubepur is a suburb in Kanpur, India, situated about 25 km from Kanpur on the Grand Trunk Road to Delhi. It is 7 km from Mandhana, a Kanpur suburb. It comes under Kanpur Metropolitan Area. The population was 4000 at the 2011 census. It has 75% of literacy.

== Travel ==
=== By road ===
Chaubepur has a bus station and UPSRTC Busses of Kanpur for Aligarh, Delhi, Ghaziabad, Bareilly etc. are available. City buses from Kanpur Metropolitan Bus Service are available here for Kanpur City.

=== By rail ===
Chaubepur has a railway station on the Kanpur-Farrukhabad line. The station code is CBR/

=== By air ===
IIT Kanpur Airstrip is nearest airstrip. Nearest domestic airport is at Kanpur and nearest international airport is at Lucknow

== Tourist attractions ==
The pilgrimage spot of Bithoor is 13 km from the town. Shoban mandir is located 12 km away. Blue world theme park is located 8 km and Sudhansu ashram is 12 km from town.

== Noneshwar Mahadev Temple ==
A temple dedicated to Shiva is situated at the bank of Non river in a nearby village named Nonha Narshinghpur. A stone inscription of Nagari script and Sanskrit language present in this temple, indicates that the temple was originally built by the king Mihira Bhoja of Gurjara-Pratihara dynasty in 9th century CE.
