= Mandhana, Kanpur =

Mandhana
- Town
- Location in Uttar Pradesh, India
- Coordinates: 26.35°N 80.09°E
- Country: India
- District: Kanpur

Government
  - Type: Gram Panchayat
  - Body: Mandhana Gram Panchayat

Area
  - Total: 20 km^{2} (7.7 sq mi)

Population (2011)
  - Total: 993
  - Density: 50/km^{2} (130/sq mi)

Languages
  - Official: Hindi
- Time zone: UTC+5:30 (IST)
- Postal code: 209217
- Vehicle registration: UP-78
- Nearest city: Bithoor, Chobepur, Kalyanpur, Ramnagar
- Literacy: 68.73%
- Lok Sabha constituency: Akbarpur and Mishrik
- Vidhan Sabha constituency: Bithoor and Bilhaur

Mandhana is a town in the Kanpur district of the Indian state of Uttar Pradesh, situated about 20 kilometres (12 mi) from Kanpur on the Grand Trunk Road to Delhi. As of the 2011 Census of India, the town had 213 households with a population of 993 of which 504 were male and 489 female. It has a 60% literacy rate and is 5 kilometres (3.1 mi) from Chobepur, its sister town. It also falls within the Kanpur metropolitan area. The language commonly spoken is Hindi with accent and tone of Kannauji. The IIT Kanpur is just 7 kilometres from Mandhana and also houses some of the successful alumnus of the institute. Mandhana is also known for private institutes like Maharana Pratap Engineering College and Rama University.

== Travel ==
Mandhana has a bus station on National Highway 91 (Grand Trunk Road) and buses for Kanpur, Kannauj, Ghaziabad, Allahabad and Fatehpur are easily available. The UPSRTC city buses of Kanpur Metropolitan Bus Service have routes from Mandhana to different localities and cities within Kanpur Metropolitan Area. Mandhana has a railway station on the Kanpur-Farrukhabad line with an additional railway line to Bithoor railway station which is being converted into broad gauge. IIT Kanpur Flight lab Aerodrome is the nearest landing facility though not for public use. Kanpur Airport is the nearest domestic airport while nearest international airport is at Lucknow.

== Tourist attractions ==
The major tourist attractions are:-

- Blue World Theme Park
- Gausiya Jama Masjid
- Awadh Villa Resort
- KD Resorts
- Banarsi Farms
- Seven Heavens
- Bankhandeshwar Temple, Bithoor road
- Iscon Temple
- JK temple (a famous Radha Krishna Temple)
- Moti jheel
- Nanarao Park
