= Kursauli =

- village
- Interactive map of Kursauli
- Country: India
- State: Uttar Pradesh
- District: Nagar

Population (2001)
  - Total: 925

Languages
  - Official: Hindi
- Time zone: UTC+5:30 (IST)
- Vehicle registration: UP
- Website: up.gov.in

Kursauli, also spelled Kursoli or Kursaoli, is a large village in Uttar Pradesh, India on the Lower Ganga Canal. It is about 3 km from Mandhana on the GT road, and about 7 km from IIT Kanpur along the path of the canal. The road from Mandhana to Tikra village crosses the canal at a pool here. The population is 925 (503 males, 422 females, 2001 census). It has a junior high and a primary school.
