= Naramau =

- suburb
- Location in Uttar Pradesh, India
- Coordinates: 26.313788°N 80.140098°E
- Country: India
- State: Uttar Pradesh
- District: Kanpur Nagar

Population
  - Total: 1,000

Languages
  - Official: Hindi
- Time zone: UTC+5:30 (IST)
- PIN: 208001
- Vehicle registration: UP-78
- Nearest city: Mandhana
- Literacy: 65%
- Lok Sabha constituency: Naramau
- Vidhan Sabha constituency: Naramau(w), Naramau(e), Naramau - Rural

Naramau is a suburb of Kanpur, India, situated about 25 km from Kanpur on the Grand Trunk Road to Delhi. It is 5 km from Mandhana, a Kanpur suburb.

== Transport ==
=== By road ===
Naramau has a bus station and UPSRTC Busses of Kanpur have routes from Naramau to different localities.

=== By rail ===
Mandhana, nearest railway station on the Kanpur-Farrukhabad line.

=== By air ===
Flight Laboratory, IIT Kanpur is nearest airport.

== Tourist attractions ==
The pilgrimage spot of Bithoor is 10 km from the town.

== Education ==
There are several schools, including St. Xavier's School.
