= Bairi Sawai =

Coordinates: 26.55170449225546°N 80.07940584852649°E

- Village
- Interactive map of Bairi Sawai
- Country: India
- District: Ramabai Nagar district

Bairi Sawai (Village ID 149196) is a village in the district of Ramabai Nagar (Kanpur Dehat), Uttar Pradesh, India. It is located 19 km away from Kalyanpur and 17 km away from the Indian Institute of Technology in Kanpur. It is home to the temple known as Shobhan Mandir. According to the 2011 census it has a population of 5528 living in 1018 households.
