= Juan Zamora (artist) =

Spanish bio-artist

- Born: 1982 (age 43–44); Madrid, Spain
- Occupations: Artist, biologist
- Style: Impressionism, German Expressionism, Latin American art
- Awards: Princess of Girona Award for Arts and Literature

Juan Zamora (born 1982) is a bio-artist from Madrid He takes inspiration of his work from pop culture, and Latino culture. Zamora is currently based in Ca´Foscari University.

== Early life & education ==
Juan Zamora was born in 1982 in Madrid, Spain. Zamora decided to make his living as an artist after he won his first art prize. He earned his BFA from University Complutense of Madrid and a master of Arts at the European University.

== Career ==
Zamora worked as a professor at UEM and universities at Pretoria and Johannesburg and worked on animation workshops at the Young Art Laboratory of Murcia, the Centro de Estudios Superiores Felipe II, the Thyssen-Bornemisza Museum, Matadero Madrid, and the Cultural Center of Spain.

Among the exhibitions and works Zamora has made include Cuando aire y nubes (When Air and Clouds), Dracula x Dracula, ocándose el cerebro (Touching His Brain) (2008), and Nube-cerebro (Cloud-Brain) (2009).
