= University of Engineering & Management, Kolkata =

Technical and Management University in Kolkata, India

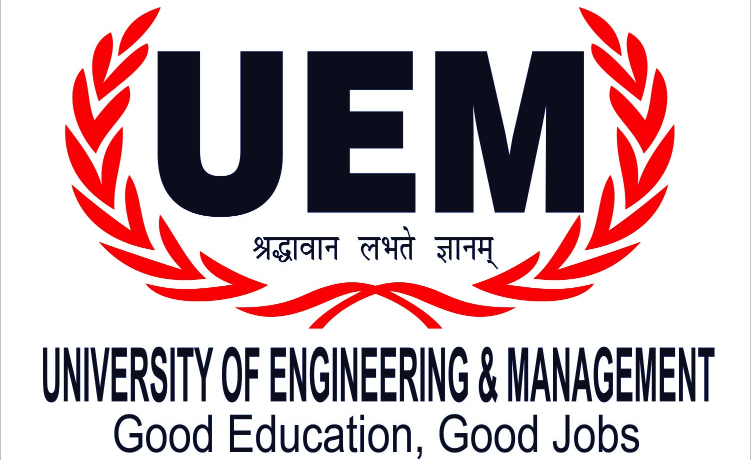
- Other names: UEM Kolkata, IEM Newtown
- Motto: Shraddhāvān labhate jnānam
- Motto in English: The earnest aspirant gains supreme wisdom with lots of extra knowledge.
- Type: Private university
- Established: 2015; 11 years ago
- Academic affiliations: UGC; AIU; AICTE; BCI
- Budget: ₹103.903 crore (US$11 million) (FY2021–22 est.)
- Chancellor: Dr. Banani Chakrabarti
- Vice-Chancellor: Dr. Satyajit Chakrabarti
- Faculty: 296 (2023)
- Students: 5,236 (2023)
- Undergraduates: 4,410 (2023)
- Postgraduates: 300 (2023)
- Doctoral students: 230 (2023)
- Location: New Town; Kolkata, West Bengal, India; 22°33′37″N 88°29′25″E
- Campus: Urban
- Colors: Blue & White
- Website: uem.edu.in/uem-kolkata/

The University of Engineering & Management (UEM), Kolkata is a private university located in New Town, Kolkata. It provides engineering, technological & management education. It was established in 2015 by IEM Trust, Act no. 25 and it is the third engineering institution founded by the University of Engineering and Management (UEM) and the Institute of Engineering and management (IEM) Group. This university is administrated by the Institute of Engineering and Management (IEM) education group trust.

== History ==
The IEM-UEM Group's presence in Kolkata began in the year 1989 as Institute of Engineering and Management (IEM) (Salt Lake, Sector V) was established in that year. It is an education group which has an experience of more than 27 years in the field of engineering and management education. In 2014, the state legislature of West Bengal passed the IEM Trust, Act no. XXV, 2014 to enable the establishment of the university in New Town area of Kolkata. It is the third engineering institution established by the IEM-UEM Group, which also established IEM and the University of Engineering & Management, Jaipur in Rajasthan in 2011.

== Academics ==
=== Recognition ===
The university is recognised by the University Grants Commission (UGC) of India and has the right to confer degrees as per section 22 of the UGC Act (1956) and UGC nomenclature of the degrees.

== Research ==
Research areas include robotics, computer programming and automobile. These groups participate in national and international level events, including: IEEE, Kshitij (organised by IIT Kharagpur), Techkriti (organised by IIT Kanpur), Srijan (techfest organised by Jadavpur University) and Techtrix (organised by RCCIIT). Students can also apply to take part in national and international level research programs like SPIE, Inspire (a program by Ministry of Science & Technology), UEMCON. The university also has student chapters on SPIE and The Optical Society of America (OSA).

Apart from this, many workshops and seminars are organised in the university campus including: robotics, ethical hacking, automobile, programming, Android app development, Python and aircraft technology.

== Student life ==
=== Innovation ===
It is the annual technical festival of IEM and UEM Kolkata which is organised in March. INNOVACIÓN is the Spanish word of innovation. It consists of many technical events like robotics, coding, gaming, circuit designing etc. As well as workshops and seminars on various technologies including Internet of Things (IoT), robotics, aeronautics, ethical hacking.

=== Cultural fest ===
The cultural fest of IEM & UEM Kolkata is organised in the end of January where students of IEM and UEM participate in various cultural activities and events.

The annual sports event is organized in the month of January where students of IEM and UEM take part in sports activities.

=== Optronix ===
In August 2016, UEM Kolkata hosted Optronix, the 3rd international conference on Opto-Electronics and Applied Optics in collaboration with The Optical Society of America (OSA) and American Journal of Electronics and Communication Technology (AJECT), Canada in its Rajarhat, Kolkata campus.

=== UEMCON ===
UEMCON is the annual international conference on Ubiquitous Computing, Electronics and Mobile Communication which is organised by UEM Kolkata in association with IEEE, USA. The 7th International conference UEMCON 2016, was held in Columbia University, New York, USA from 20 to 22 October 2016 in association with IEEE USA and IEEE New York.

=== ConnecTech ===
ConnecTech is the annual Technical Bonanza of UEM Kolkata. It is the technical bonanza where UEM Kolkata organizes science and technological exhibition for the school and college students of Bihar and Jharkhand in association with Bihar Council of Science & Technology (BCST), Govt. of Bihar. On 17 and 19 January 2017, UEM organized ConnecTech in IGSC Auditorium, Patna and St. Joseph's Club Auditorium, Ranchi. The event comprises Quiz, Mathematics Olympiad, Debate, Science Model Competition, Robotics Exhibition. More than 1000 students from different schools of Bihar and Jharkhand actively participated in the events in 2017.

Apart from this, IEM and UEM jointly organized the international IEEE CCWC 2017 conference in Las Vegas, USA from 9 to 11 January 2017.

=== Job Fair 2017 ===
On 25 January 2017 UEM Kolkata organized "Mega Job Mela" in association with Fresher's Job Pvt Ltd. where more than 30 companies came for recruiting freshers. Jobs were of all types and categories, starting from jobs for Mechanical engineers, Electrical engineers, IT professionals, Java developers, content writers, front desk executives etc. There was a footfall of about 5000 students in the job mela. On 22 March 2017, UEM Jaipur organized the "Mega Job Mela" in association with the Govt. of Rajasthan where more than 50 companies came for recruiting freshers.

=== Technocruise 2017 ===
UEM Kolkata hosted Technocruise 2017 - The eastern zonal of Techkriti, IIT Kanpur where UEM Kolkata has been awarded as the best zonal by IIT Kanpur. Technocruise 2017 included workshops, seminars and events on various topics of science and technology including Android App Development, Internet Of Things, Ethical Hacking, Robotics, Sixth Sense Technology, Aircraft technology.

Apart from these, UEM Kolkata hosted the national HR meet in IISC Bangalore on 25 February 2017. It hosted the IEM - UEM Kolkata marathon in association with The Telegraph on 19 February 2017 for raising donation for Child Rights and You (CRY).
