= Rama University =

- Type: Private
- Established: 2014
- Founder: Late. Dr. B.S Kushwaha
- Affiliations: UGC, NAAC, AICTE, DCI, MCI, INC, BCI, UPSMF
- President: Mrs. Rama Kushwaha
- Vice-Chancellor: Dr. Janardhan Amarnath B.J
- Location: Kanpur, Uttar Pradesh, India
- Campus: Urban
- Colors: Oxford Blue and Gold
- Website: Rama University

Rama University is located in Kanpur in Uttar Pradesh, India. It is a private university and part of the Rama Group.

A first-year B. Pharma student died by suicide at Rama Medical College and Hospital in the Bithoor area, Kanpur.

== Faculties ==
Rama University comprises the following faculties:

- Faculty of Medical Sciences
- Faculty of Nursing
- Faculty of Dental Sciences
- Faculty of Health and Nutrition Sciences
- Faculty of Engineering and Technology
- Faculty of Commerce and Management
- Faculty of Professional Studies
- Faculty of Juridical Sciences (Law)
- Faculty of Agricultural Sciences and Allied Industries
- Faculty of Pharmaceutical Sciences
- Faculty of Paramedical Sciences
