= Chakeri railway station =

Railway station in Uttar Pradesh, India

Chakeri

General information
- Coordinates: 26.3818907°N 80.406798°E
- System: Indian Railways station
- Platforms: 2
Location
- Location within India Location within Uttar Pradesh

Chakeri is a railway station in Chakeri, a suburb of Kanpur. It lies on the Delhi–Howrah line. Its station code is CHK.

== Gallery ==
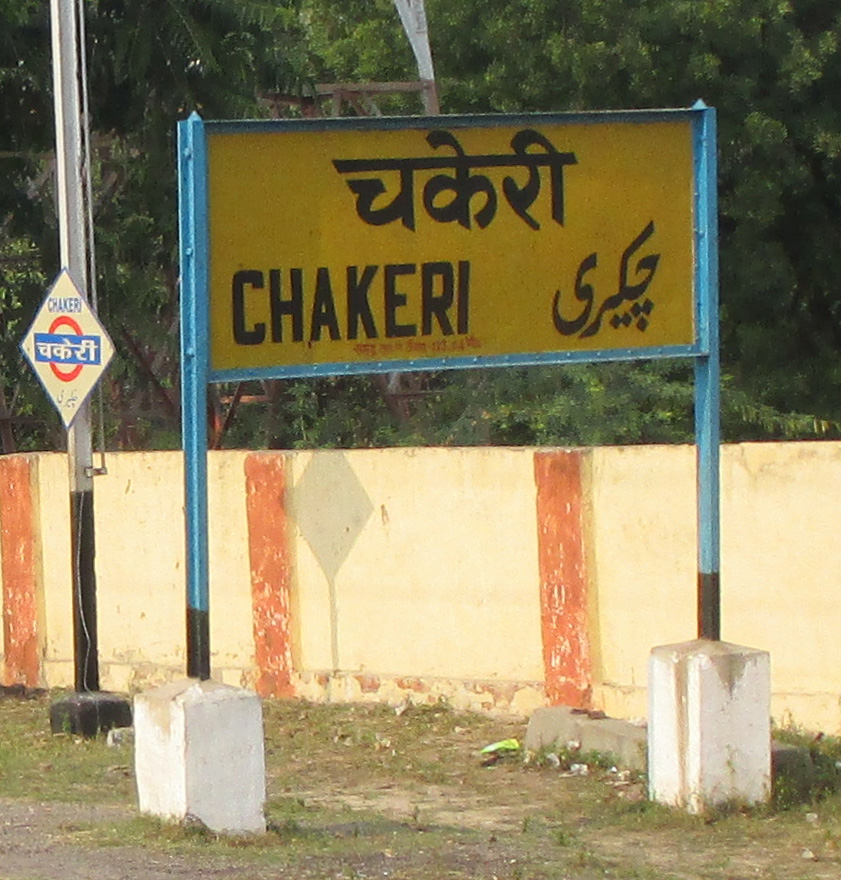
Chakeri railway station platform board

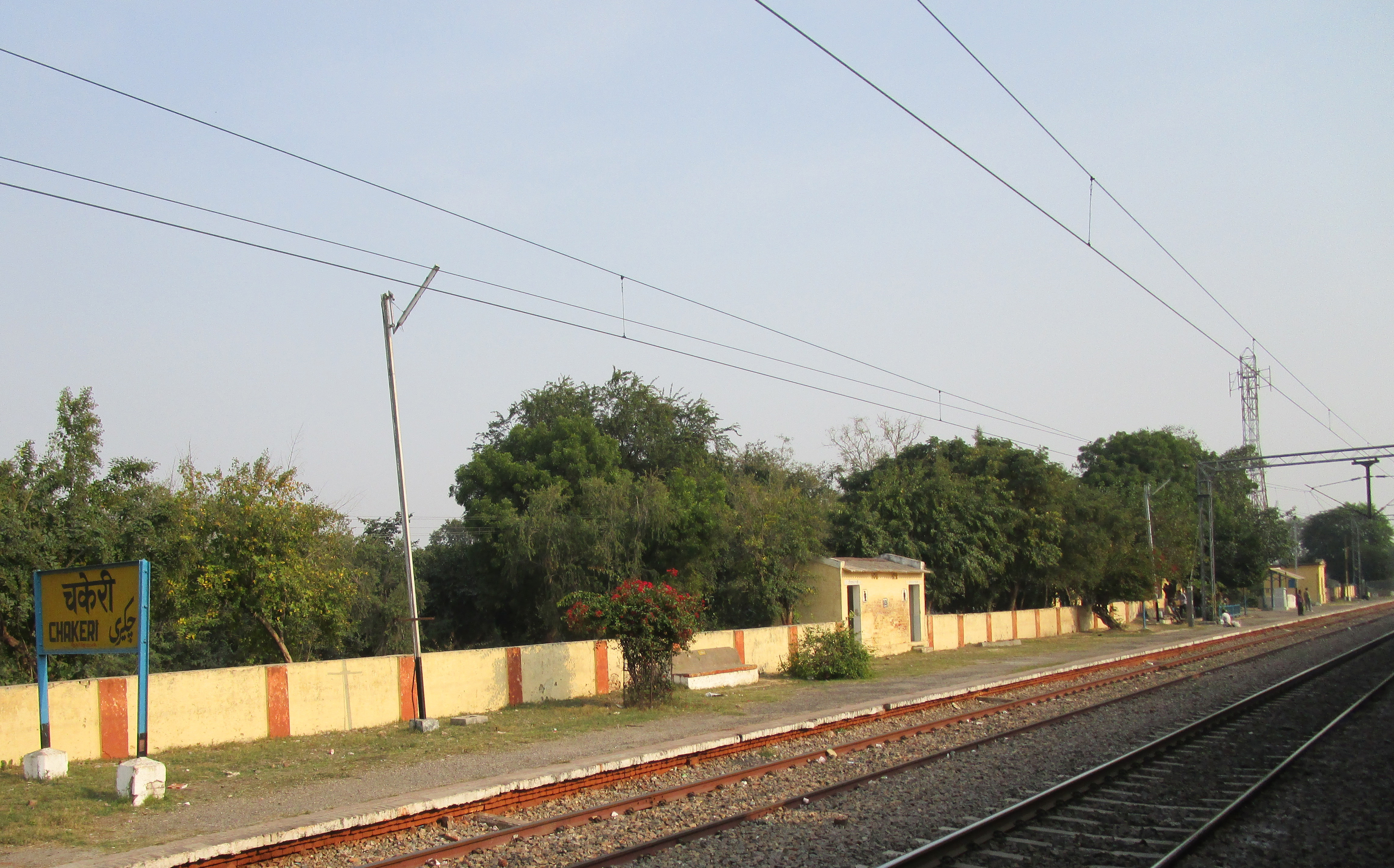
Chakeri railway station at Kanpur
