= Mandhana Junction railway station =

Railway station in Uttar Pradesh, India

Mandhana Junction

General information
- Location: GT Road, Mandhana, Kanpur; India
- Coordinates: 26.35°N 80.09°E
- Elevation: 132 metres (433 ft)
- System: Indian Railways station
- Owner: Indian Railways
- Line: Kanpur – Farukkhabad line
- Platforms: 1
- Tracks: 2
- Connections: Auto stand

Construction
- Parking: No
- Cycle facilities: No

Other information
- Status: Active
- Station code: MDA
- Fare zone: North Eastern Railway
Location
- Location within India Location within Uttar Pradesh

Mandhana Junction railway station is a small railway station in Kanpur district, Uttar Pradesh. Its code is MDA. It serves Kanpur city. The station consists of a single platform. The platform is not well sheltered. It lacks many facilities including water and sanitation.

== Trains ==
- Kanpur–Farukhabad Passenger
- Lucknow Junction–Kasganj Passenger
- Allahabad–Farukhabad Passenger

== Development ==
Indian Railways has planned to discard the railway line from Anwarganj to Mandhana and connect Mandhana Junction with Panki thus Mandhana will become an important railway station in north-western Kanpur. There are plans to operate trains from Bithoor to New Delhi and towards Mumbai via Rajasthan by connecting Mandhana with Howrah–Delhi main line near Panki.
