= Institute of Engineering and Management =

Educational institute in Kolkata, India

Coordinates: 22.4856°N 88.3444°E

Institute of Engineering & Management, Saltlake Campus
- Type: Private
- Established: 1989
- Academic affiliations: AICTE, UEMK
- Principal: Dr. Arun Kumar Bar, Prof. Anupam Bhattacharya
- Director: Satyajit Chakrabarti
- Location: Kolkata, West Bengal, India
- Campus: Urban
- Website: https://iem.edu.in/

Institute of Engineering & Management is an Autonomous engineering and management college located in Kolkata, West Bengal, India. It is one of the oldest engineering college in West Bengal, founded in 1989. It is affiliated to University of Engineering & Management, Kolkata.

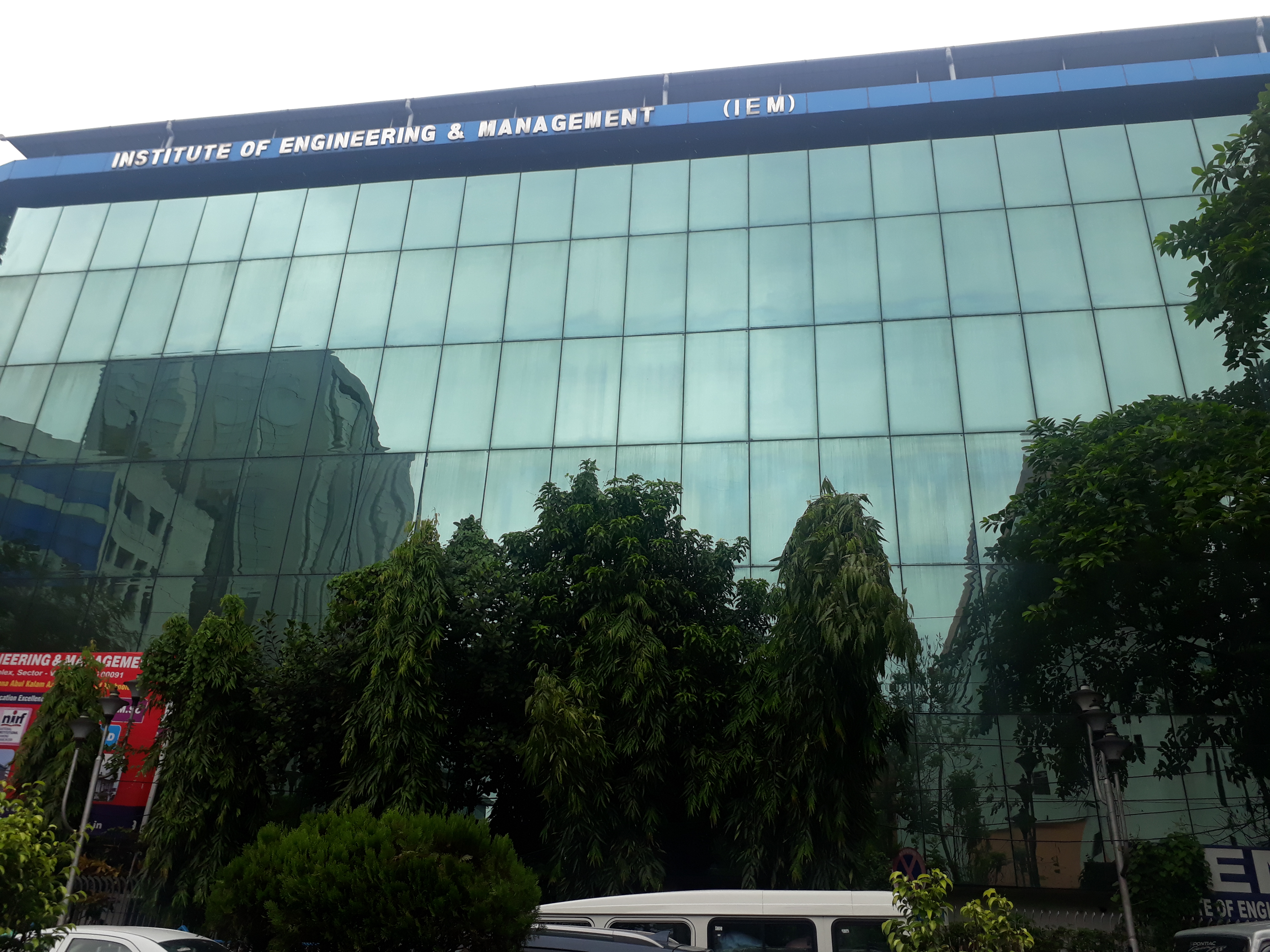
Gurukul Building - IEM, Kolkata

== Ranking ==
University & College rankings

Engineering – India
- NIRF (2024): 151-200

It is a NAAC grade 'A' college.

In India, Institute of Engineering & Management ranked 151-200 among engineering colleges by the National Institutional Ranking Framework (NIRF) in 2024.
