= Kalyanpur, Uttar Pradesh =

Kalyanpur
- Town
- Location in Uttar Pradesh, India Kalyanpur (India)
- Coordinates: 26.519121°N 80.249805°E
- Country: India
- State: Uttar Pradesh
- District: Kanpur

Government
  - Body: (1) Kalyanpur Police Station (Law & Order) (2)Uttar Pradesh Avas Evam Vikas Parishad Kanpur (All Maintenance & Civil Construction Work)

Population
  - Total: 112,014

Languages
  - Official: Hindi, English, Urdu & Kannauji
- Time zone: UTC+5:30 (IST)
- PIN: 208017
- Vehicle registration: UP-78, UP-77
- Nearest city: Kanpur
- Literacy: 91%
- Lok Sabha constituency: Akbarpur
- Vidhan Sabha constituency: Kalyanpur(w), Kalyanpur(e), Kalyanpur – Rural
- Civic agency: Kalyanpur Police Station
- Website: up.gov.in upavp.in/post/en-kanpur-Schemes

Kalyanpur or Kalianpur (earlier Kullianpore) is a satellite town of Kanpur in Uttar Pradesh, India. Located about 15 km from Kanpur on the Grand Trunk Road towards Delhi, it is effectively a suburb of Kanpur. This town's post office is spelled Kalyanpur, but the station is named Kalianpur, while British records often use the variant spelling "Kullianpur". Kalyanpur is also the name of a different village in East UP.

== History ==
During the Indian rebellion of 1857, Nana Sahib met rebel company soldiers at Kalyanpur. Soldiers were on their way to Delhi to meet Bahadur Shah II. After a one-day march, they camped at Kalyanpur on 7 June, where they met Nana Sahib and Azimullah, who convinced them to turn back and free Kanpur from the control of British India.

Once it was home to many of the rebellion's most prominent characters, including the Rani of Jhansi, Rani Lakshmibai. During the War of Indian Independence of 1857, the mutineering sepoys marched to Delhi to join the emperor.

There were a few hours of stillness before the storm; the faithful sepoys were now employed in collecting and carting muskets, ammunition, etc., which had been left about in the native lines. The English officers drew a long breath of relief: the mutineers had doubtless gone off to Delhi. At present they had only gone as far as the treasury, when the Nana met them with an escort and many elephants, swore fidelity to the national cause, and distributed much of the silver among the four regiments. Then the sepoys broke open the gaol and let out a motley host of God-forsaken rascals, who set to work at once and burned and sacked every European house, making a bonfire of all the records in the court-house, civil and criminal alike. The mutineers had travelled on the Delhi road as far as Kullianpur when they were overtaken by the Nana, his two brothers, Bala and Baba Bhut, and Azimoolah.

== Location ==
After Indian Independence, this area became one of the most overcrowded areas of Kanpur.

Kalyanpur lies in North Kanpur and covers a large area, consisting of several large and smaller areas. The main areas are Indira Nagar, Avas Vikas Colonies, Navsheel Dham, Shivli Road, Bithoor Road, Guba Gardens, Mirzapur, Bara Sirohi, New Colony and Kalyanpur proper. Avas Vikas Colonies and Navsheel Dham are new colonies and are moderately planned. The Kalyanpur proper consists of mostly single-storey houses.

Indira Nagar is situated 1.5 km north of Kalyanpur. Though the area has its own post office, it is considered a Kalyanpur suburb. A Buddha park built by Mayawati is located within Indira Nagar; it is the largest park in the whole city.

Kalyanpur has a railway station on the Anwarganj-Mathura rail line.

== Demographics ==
Kalyanpur's population is 173,949. Out of this, 92851 are males while the females count 81098 here. This block has 24297 children in the age group of 0–6 years. Among them 13009 are boys and 11288 are girls. Literacy ratio in Kalyanpur block is 65%. 113564 out of total 173949 population is literate. In males the literacy rate is 70% as 65793 males out of total 92851 are literate; however, female literacy rate is 58% as 47771 out of total 81098 females are educated in this block.

== Micropolitan area ==
The main areas in micro area are Indira Nagar, Avas Vikas Parishad Colonies, Navsheel Dham, Shivli road, Bithoor Road, Guba Gardens, Mirzapur, Bara Sirohi, Naramau, Binakyapur, Avas Vikas Keshavpuram -1, Avas Vikas Ambedkarpuram-2, Maswanpur, Kakadev, Kanpur University, Rawatpur, IIT Kanpur and Kalyanpur City. Avas Vikas Colonies and Navsheel Dham are new colonies and are moderately planned by UP Avas Evam Vikas Parishad Kanpur (www.upavp.in). The proper Kalyanpur area consists of mostly single storey houses situated in a congested manner.

"Uttar Pradesh Avas Vikas Parishad Has 2 Schemes Named as" 1) Keshav Puram Scheme -1 2) Ambedkar Puram Scheme -2 These schemes are monitored and maintained by “Uttar Pradesh Avas Vikas Parishad Kanpur”

== Educational institutes ==
Kanpur University is located here. Kalianpur hosts several educational institutions including the National Sugar Institute and The Indian Institute of Pulses Research, whilst Kanpur Polytechnic and the famous technical institute IIT Kanpur campus are both situated nearby. A non-governmental association, Society for Tropical Plant Research is also working here, and serves the scientific community through its international scientific journal - Tropical Plant Research. Other schools include DPS Kalyanpur, Dr. V.S.E.C. Awadhpuri, Woodbine Gardenia School, Mantora Public School, etc.

== Connectivity ==
The area has one of the largest vegetable markets in the city due to its proximity to the rural areas and nearby districts of western Uttar Pradesh. The suburb lies on the historic Grand Trunk Road commonly known as G.T.Road towards Delhi which is situated 415 km away. The Kanpur-Kasganj-Aligarh-Bhiwani Railway line runs just parallel to the G.T.Road in Kalyanpur.

The suburb is well connected with the rest of the city by road as well as railways. The industrial area of Panki lies 5 km south of Kalyanpur and is well connected with Kalyanpur.

The pilgrimage village of Bithoor, 12 km away, connects to the GT road here. Bithoor is connected with Kalyanpur with 2 roads. Formerly the metre gauge line ran through Kalyanpur and was connected to Brahmavart railway station in Bithoor. But due to conversion of the metre gauge railway line to broad gauge line the railway route to Bithoor was subsequently closed and the Brahmavart railway station now remains deserted. The Indian Railways has decided to extend the line from Mandhana Central-Safipur Junction via Brahmavart Station. There were vital demands from the public to restart the railway route connecting Kanpur Central railway station to Brahmavarta, Bithoor though the matter remains reserved. The Government is planning new townships in Kalyanpur suburb and many real estates are coming up in the suburb.

== Sister cities ==
- Saratoga, New York, United States
- Princeton, New Jersey
