= Chakeri =

Chakeri Ramadevi
- town
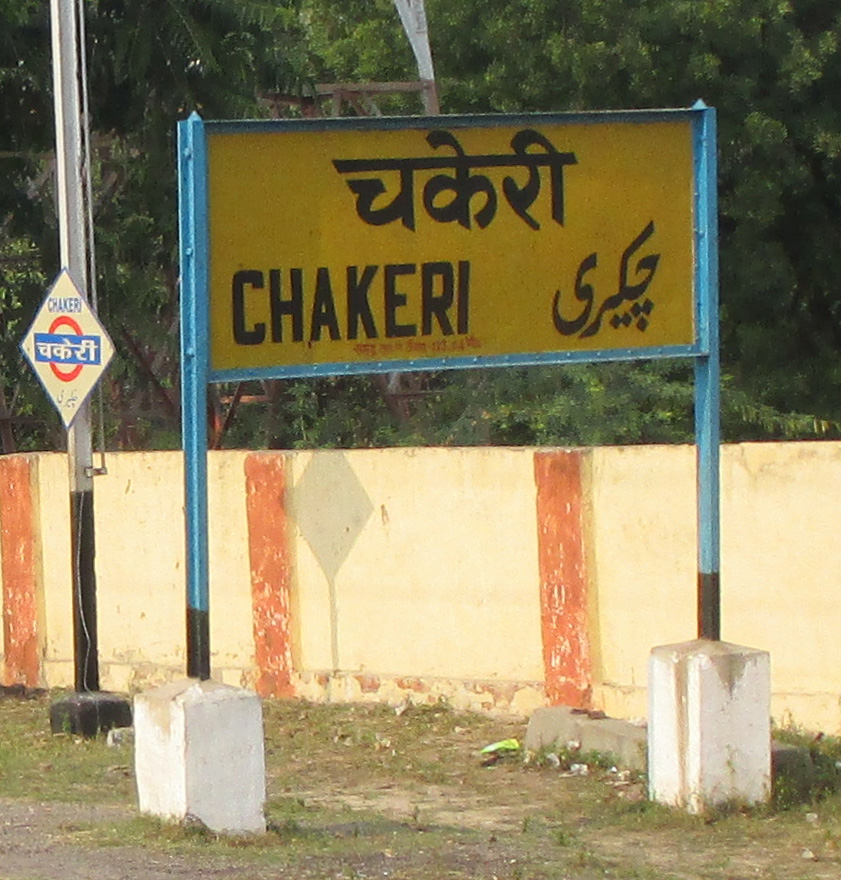
- Chakeri railway station nameplate

- Location in Uttar Pradesh, India Location in India
- Coordinates: 26.41°N 80.41°E
- Country: India
- State: Uttar Pradesh
- District: Kanpur Nagar

Government
  - Type: Census town
  - Body: Town Area Development Authority

Area
  - Total: 5.21 km^{2} (2.01 sq mi)
- Elevation: 123 m (404 ft)

Population (2011)
  - Total: 7,526
  - Density: 1,647/km^{2} (4,270/sq mi)

Languages
  - Official: Hindi
- Time zone: UTC+5:30 (IST)
- PIN: 208 007
- Vehicle registration: UP-78
- Nearest city: Kanpur
- Literacy: 95%
- Lok Sabha constituency: Kanpur (Lok Sabha constituency)
- Vidhan Sabha constituency: Maharajpur
- Civic agency: Chakeri Municipality

Chakeri is a prominent census town within the Kanpur metropolitan area, located approximately 16 km east of Kanpur city in Uttar Pradesh, India. The town hosts the Chakeri Air Force Station, North India's second-largest air base.

== Demographics ==
Chakeri has a population of 7,526 of which 3,803 are males while 3,723 are females as per Census 2011. The population of children ages 0-6 is 1116 which is 14.83% of the total population of Chakeri. In Chakeri, the female sex ratio is 979 against the state average of 912. Moreover, the child sex ratio in Chakeri is around 996 compared to the Uttar Pradesh state average of 902. The literacy rate of Chakeri city is 89.63%, higher than the state average of 67.68%. In Chakeri, male literacy is around 93.74% while the female literacy rate is 85.41%. Chakeri Census Town has total administration over 2,109 houses to which it supplies basic amenities like water and sewerage.

== History ==
Chakeri is a suburb of Jajmau on the banks of river Ganges. The founder of the town was Gangadeen Yadav. He built wells, a temple and restrooms for passengers in the memory of his mother Ramadevi. An artificial pond made by emperor Sher Shah Suri is also present in the town. Chakeri Air Force Station which was established in the 1970s is the second largest air force base in north India.

== Education ==
Chakeri is an educational hub in East Kanpur. Many private and government colleges and institutes are present here. Kanpur Institute of Technology, Vision Group of Colleges, Allenhouse Group of Colleges, Apollo Institutes, Axis college, Central Leather Research Institute and Ratan Industrial Training Institute are major educational institutions in Chakeri.

== Roads ==
The important highways which pass through Chakeri are:-

National Highway 2

The NHAI proposes to upgrade a road project in Uttar Pradesh. The Authority intends to take up six-laning of the Etawah-Ramadevi chowk (Kanpur) section of NH-2 from Km 323.475 to Km 483.687 under NHDP Phase V. The project is expected to cost Rs 1,698.50 crore. RFQs have been invited from prospective entities, with last date of submission being 10 December 2010.

National Highway 25

== Transport ==
=== Airways ===
Kanpur Airport is situated in Chakeri which has flights to Delhi, Mumbai and Ahmedabad. The airport is expected to be connected with other major cities of India, Middle East and the Orient by 2020.

=== Railways ===
Chakeri Railway Station is on the Delhi-Howrah line. Kanpur Central Railway Station is 12 km away from Chakeri. Public transport is easily available throughout 24 hrs from Chakeri Railway Station Bus Stop situated 750 metres from the station on NH 2.

=== Roadways ===
Chakeri has KMBS terminal and City Buses of Kanpur have routes from different bus stops of Chakeri to different localities and suburban towns of Kanpur metropolitan area. One can catch interstate buses from Ramadevi at a regular frequency. Multinational cab companies like Ola and Uber have their services in the town.

== People ==
Some famous personalities from Chakeri are:-

- Sriprakash Jaiswal (former Union Coal Minister under UPA government)
- Satish Mahana (politician)
- Ghazala Lari (politician)
- Kritika Kamra (actress, alumni of St Joseph's School)
- Poonam Dhillon (alumni of Air Force School)
- Kuldeep Yadav (cricketer)
