= Kanpur City Transport Services Limited =

Public transport in Uttar Pradesh, India

Overview
- Locale: Kanpur, Uttar Pradesh, India
- Transit type: Bus
- Daily ridership: 10,000+
- Website: uputd.gov.in/kanpurctsl

Operation
- Operator: Kanpur City Transport Services Limited
- Number of vehicles: 340

Technical
- System length: 215 kilometres (134 mi)

Kanpur Metropolitan Bus Service (KMBS), is a committee which oversees bus service in the Kanpur metropolitan area.

== History ==
The city bus service began in 2006 with a fleet of 100 buses. The city buses were brought under the control of Jawaharlal Nehru National Urban Renewal Mission (JNNURM), the Indian government's urban-modernisation scheme, in 2009. The service, formerly known as Mahanagar Bus Seva in Hindi, began operating on 6 July 1922.

== Routes ==
The following table includes private bus routes.

Route	Origin	Terminus	Via
1	Sarai Mita	Bada Chauraha, Sarsiya Ghat	Barra Bypass → Yasoda Nagar → Kidwai Nagar State Highway → Chalis Dukan → Tatmil → Kanpur Central
2	Chakeri Mod	Mandhana	Ramadevi, Shyam Nagar, Krishna Nagar, Chandari, Shahid Major Salman Khan Bus Station, Anwarganj, Rawatpur, Kalyanpur, IIT, Naramau
3	Shyam Nagar	Bada Chauraha	NH 2, Chandari, Civil Aerodrome
4	Yashoda Nagar	Barra	
5	Raniya	Ghanta Ghar	
6A	Bada Chauraha	Bithoor	
6B	Kanpur Central	Mandhana	
7	Barra	Barra Jarauli	Barra Bypass → Sachan GuestHouse, Barra → Nandlal, Govind Nagar → Baradevi → Chalis Dukan → Tatmil → Kanpur Central
8	Bada Chauraha	Ramdevi	
9	Afim Kothi	Bingava	
10	Ghanta Ghar	Raniya	
11	Bada Chauraha	Mandi Samiti	
12	World Bank	Moolganj	
13	Jarib Chauki	Moolganj	
14	Yasoda Nagar	Kanpur Zoo	
15	Mandi Samiti Naubasta	Kanpur Central	
16	Baghpur Tekra	Bada Chauraha	
17	Kanpur Zoo	Kisan Nagar	
18	Jajmau	Kisan Nagar	
19	Jajmau	Bithoor	
20	Bithoor	Bada Chauraha	
21	Ramadevi	Raniya	
22	Shastri Chowk, Barra	Rawatpur Gutiya	
23	Shivrajpur	Maharajpur	
24	Bithor	Jajmau	
25	Bhaunti	Shuklaganj	
26	Wazidpur	Bithoor	
27	Bithoor	Wazidpur	

== Airport service ==
KMBS operates air-conditioned buses from outlying areas to Kanpur Airport. The route includes:

- IIT Gate
- Kalianpur Railway Station
- Kanpur University Gate
- Gurudev Crossing
- Vikas Nagar Bus Depot
- KDA Signature
- Allen Forest Zoological Park
- Dr. Tilak Crossing
- Company Bagh Crossing
- Emerald Garden
- Gastro Liver Hospital
- Hallet Crossing
- GSVM Medical College
- Model Town
- Mariampur Hospital
- Chawla Crossing
- Nirala Nagar
- Gaushala Road Crossing
- Naubasta Crossing
- Via Bypass Flyover:
  - U-turn near Chakeri
  - U-turn near Axis Bank ATM Ahirwan
- Airport
