= Flight Laboratory, IIT Kanpur =

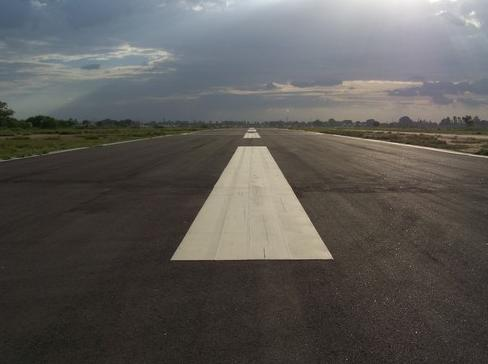
- IATA: none; ICAO: VI75

Summary
- Airport type: Private
- Owner: IIT Kanpur
- Location: IIT Kanpur campus, Kalyanpur, Kanpur, India
- Coordinates: 26°31′14″N 080°13′51″E
- Website: https://www.iitk.ac.in/aero/flight-laboratory

Map
- Location of IIT Kanpur Airfield IIT Kanpur (India)

Runways
Direction	Length		Surface
Direction	m	ft	Surface
09/27	1,000	3,500	Asphalt

Flight Laboratory, IIT Kanpur is an airstrip/aerodrome located inside IIT Kanpur's campus at Kalyanpur, 18 kilometres west of city of Kanpur, India. It is used by the Aerospace Engineering department of IIT Kanpur. Pawan Hans began a helicopter ferry service to Lucknow from June 2013, which was later quietly shut down.

== History ==
IIT Kanpur received collaborative technical assistance from a consortium of nine leading US universities when it was being set up. Considering the intense research potentials and rapid growth in the field of aviation at that time, it was decided to establish the faculty of Aeronautical Engineering at IIT Kanpur. Under the USAID educational assistance project, an all-weather 884x61 m small airstrip was set up with a Flight Laboratory. The Lab was equipped with Piper PA-18 and Cessna 182 powered aircraft and Schweizer 2-22 and Schweizer 1-26 gliders. A Rohini glider, designed and developed at Technical Center of Civil Aviation Department and manufactured at HAL, was the jewel in the crown of the Flight Lab. The open cockpit, side-by-side seating, fabric covered wooden structure glider became very popular among students and used extensively for research work. Soon the Flight Lab. swung into action and the gliders were aero-towed to desired heights with students on board for the complex studies of aerodynamics and flight mechanics.

The glider flying programme was an instant hit with the students of IIT Kanpur. Due to the massive response, membership was restricted to a number of selected students. Soaring flights of over five hours and altitudes over 10,000 feet became common events. Many students who were unable to become members became frequent visitors for joyrides. The campus residents were not to be left far behind, and visited the centre with family and friends to lose the feel of being earth-bound.

== See also ==
- List of airports by ICAO code: V#VA VE VI VO - India
- List of airports in India
- IIT Kanpur#Laboratories and other facilities
- Kanpur Airport
