= Techkriti =

Annual Technical and Entrepreneurial Festival in Kanpur, India

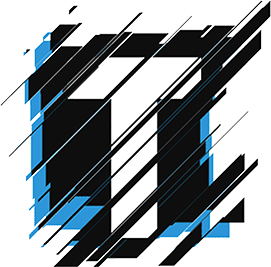
- Genre: Technical, Entrepreneurial
- Dates: March 27, 2025 - March 31, 2025
- Venue: Indian Institute of Technology Kanpur
- Locations: Kanpur, India
- Founded: 1995
- Attendance: 200 colleges
- Patrons: UNESCO, IEEE
- Organiser: IIT Kanpur students
- Filing status: Non-profit student organisation
- Website: www.techkriti.org

Techkriti is an annual four-day inter-collegiate technical and entrepreneurship festival at the Indian Institute of Technology Kanpur. The festival is usually held in March. The 31st Edition of Techkriti was scheduled to be held from 27 to 31 March 2025. The festival began in 1995 to develop student technological innovation. The word Techkriti is derived from tech (technology) and the Sanskrit kriti (creation).

== History ==
The first Techkriti was held in March 1995 and has since continued as the institute's annual technological and entrepreneurial festival. Since then the fest has grown and is claimed to be Asia's largest technical and entrepreneurial fest.

Techkriti events (2007–2023)
Event	Dates	Details
Techkriti '07	22 to 25 February 2007	Included an air show by the Indian Air Force's Akash Ganga skydiving team
Techkriti '08	14 to 17 February 2008	Techkriti'08 was a remarkable celebration of innovation and technology, bringing together participants from over 150 colleges nationwide. The festival featured inspiring keynote presentations by renowned figures such as Nobel laureate Peter Grünberg, cybernetics pioneer Kevin Warwick, and business leader Harsh Manglik. Their thought-provoking talks highlighted the spirit of innovation and knowledge that defined the event..
Techkriti '09	12 to 15 February 2009	Techkriti'09 hosted an exceptional lineup of speakers, including Stephen Wolfram, creator of Mathematica and Wolfram Alpha; David Morrison, a NASA scientist known for his work in planetary defense; G. Madhavan Nair, former ISRO chairman; and Ron Eglash, a pioneer in ethnomathematics. Their talks offered inspiring insights into science, technology, and innovation.
Techkriti '10	11 to 14 February 2010	observed IIT Kanpur's golden jubilee and included Nikolaos Mavridis (developer of the world's first Arabic-speaking humanoid robot
Techkriti '11	17 to 20 February 2011	hosted over 1,500 students who participated in 27 events. Competitions included unmanned aerial vehicles, cruise control, a robot talent show, robogames and a simulation video game on the Great Wall of China. Speakers and guests included Russian mathematician Vladimir Voevodsky, astronaut Bruce E. Melnick, Millau Viaduct designer Michael Gratzel, voting-system designer David Bismark, Hellion Ventures managing director Ashish Gupta and Royal Orchid Hotels founder Chander Baljee.
Techkriti '12	27 to 30 January 2012	had a theme of "Technology for the Future". The opening ceremony's guest of honour was GNU founder Richard Stallman. Deborah Berebichez, Vic Hayes, and Deepak Mohanty were other guest speakers. The final day included a performance by playback singer Kailash Kher.
Techkriti '13	14 to 17 March 2013	had a theme of "Fixing the Planet" for the festival's 18th edition.
Techkriti'14	6 to 9 March 2014	Embraced the theme "Virtually Progressive World," reflecting the rapid advancements in technology and the increasing integration of virtual innovations into our daily lives. The event featured an impressive lineup of distinguished guest speakers, including Alvin Eliot Roth, the Nobel Laureate in Economic Sciences, who shared his insights on market design and game theory; Rakesh Sharma, the first Indian astronaut to journey into space, who inspired the audience with his remarkable experiences and perspectives on exploration; and Walter Hendrik Gustav Lewin, the renowned physicist and educator, celebrated for his engaging teaching style and groundbreaking contributions to physics, who captivated attendees with his passion for science and learning..
Techkriti '15	19 to 22 March 2015	It had the theme "Blueprint to a smarter world". Under the umbrella of UNESCO, in association with Classmate, Juniper Networks, Vh1, and Myntra amongst others, it included newer initiatives like Start-up Weekend, and Robo-games like Robo Pirates (Aqua-Robogames), Multirotor (Quadro copter), Richie Rich (Portfolio Optimization), Marketing Villa, Bridge Design Challenge and many others.
Techkriti '16	3 to 6 March 2016	Techkriti'16, with its theme "Beyond Our Planet," delved into the fascinating realms of space and advanced science, inspiring attendees to think beyond Earth's boundaries. The event featured Lyndon Rees Evans , the esteemed physicist known for leading the Large Hadron Collider (LHC) project at CERN. Dr. Evans shared his expertise on the LHC's groundbreaking discoveries and its role in deepening humanity's understanding of the universe, perfectly complementing the festival's ambitious vision of exploring the unknown and fostering innovation.
Techkriti '17	23 to 26 March 2017	Techkriti'17, with its theme "Factualising Fictions," celebrated the journey of turning imaginative ideas into reality. The event featured notable speakers like Geoffrey Beattie, Sumit Chowdhury, Vijay Prasad Dimri, Devika Sirohi, Arsh Shah Dilbagi, Ian Angell, and others, who shared insights from diverse fields. Their talks reflected the spirit of innovation and the pursuit of transforming fiction into fact, resonating perfectly with the festival’s vision.
Techkriti '18	15 to 18 March 2018	It had the theme of "Prism of Possibilities". The guest speakers included Simon Taufel, Karnal Singh, Mohsin Wali, Jon Bowermaster among others. The final day included the participants grooving to the melodies of Bollywood’s favorite, Sonu Nigam.
Techkriti '19	7 to 10 March 2019	It had a theme of "Forging The Matrix".A colossal affair of technology and science, it hosted academic giants like Kannan Ramamurthy, Meenakshi Lekhi, Satyarup Siddhanta, Archana Sharma, and others. The Chief guest for the fest was Dinesh Sharma, the Deputy Chief Minister of Uttar Pradesh. It also hosted unprecedented workshops on niche topics like Building Architecture & fun events like Paintball, CS-GO, Bike stunt shows. The cultural extravaganza had shows by Zakir Khan, Benny Dayal and Nucleya.
Techkriti '20	19 to 22 March 2020	It had the theme of “Cybernetic Utopia”. The first online edition of Techkriti. It hosted workshops on stocks, data science, python programming, machine learning & robotics. Pandering to the gamers, it also held PUBG Tournaments, a solution for games amidst Covid restrictions.
Techkriti '21	12 to 14 March 2021	It had a theme of “Realm of Virtuality”. This year Techkriti was conducted in a fully online mode, because of Covid’19 constraints. The talks and sessions were delivered by prodigies like Pravin Mahadeo Thipsay, John Cromwell Mather, Pete Micheals, Bikash Sinha, Dr. Rajendra Singh amongst others. It also had virtual comedy nights by artists like Nishant Suri, Vipul Goyal & Kanan Goyal. The final day included a grand virtual concert by the playback singer Krishnakumar Kunnath popularly known as KK.
Techkriti '22	24 to 27 March 2022	With the theme of “Transcending Origins”, Techkriti'22 had been touted to be the “legacy restorer” as it was a hybrid fest, recovering from the repercussions of Covid’19. Rajat Sharma, Bjarne Stroustrup, Jitendra Nath Goswami & Dr. Lyn Evans were a few of the other speakers present at the event. The festival was concluded with a concert by the singing maestro, Shantanu Mukherjee popularly known as Shaan.
Techkriti '23	23 to 26 March 2023	It had a theme of “Enigmatic Tessellations”. IIT Kanpur’s Techkriti'23, Asia's one of the largest annual technical and entrepreneurial festivals, kicked off with its 29th edition on March 23, 2023. The inaugural ceremony was graced by the presence of Abhay Karandikar, Director IIT Kanpur; Prof. Arnab Bhattacharya (Associate Dean, Students Affairs), and Prof. Amitabha Bandyopadhyay, the FAC (Festival Advisory Committee) Chairman.
Techkriti '24	14 to 17 March 2024	With the theme of “The Cosmic Nexus,” Techkriti'24 was held from 14 to 17 March 2024. The festival witnessed the participation of notable personalities, including Samay Raina (Comedy Night) and Farhan Akhtar (Pronight), along with eminent speakers such as G. Satheesh Reddy, R. K. S. Bhadauria, Ajai Chowdhry, Aman Dhattarwal, and Gaurav Juyal. Techkriti'24 introduced several new initiatives, including a drift show that became a flagship attraction of the festival. The event also marked the launch of the first edition of the Sustainability Summit, aimed at addressing global environmental challenges. Additionally, the festival hosted a large-scale entrepreneurial event, E-Conclave, in collaboration with the Startup Incubation and Innovation Centre (SIIC).

== Organisation ==
Techkriti is an entirely student organized festival. The structure of the organising team is four-tiered. Leading the team were the Festival Coordinators along with a team of Heads, each with an allotted portfolio. Administrative portfolios include marketing, media and publicity, finance, security, hospitality and show management. Event-related portfolios include public relations, web and design. Each Head has his own team of coordinators and executives.

== Workshops and talks ==
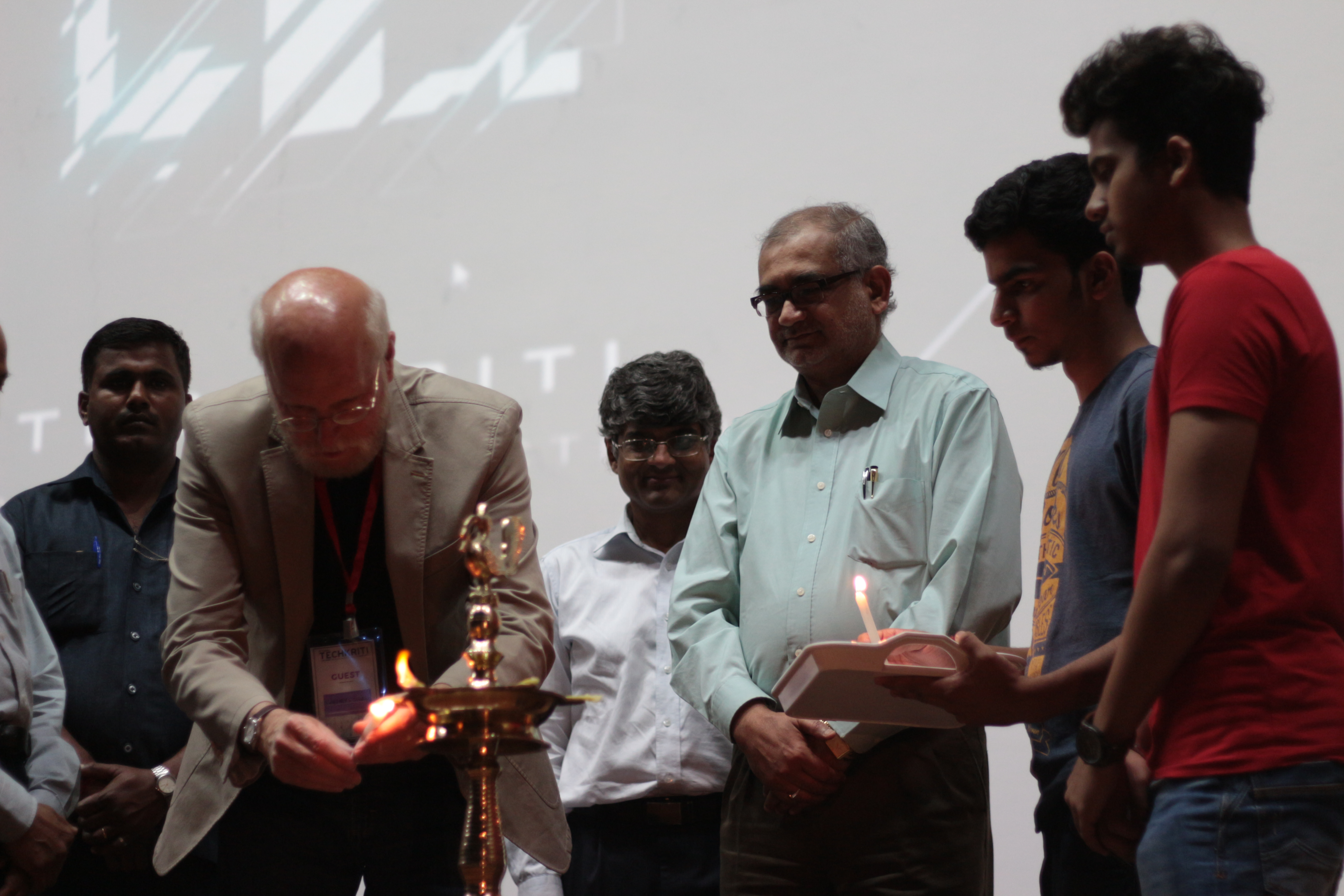
The 2017 Techkriti

Students and academia at the festival can attend talks by professionals in various fields from India and abroad. Speakers at Techkriti have included aerospace scientist and former Indian president A. P. J. Abdul Kalam, Free Software Foundation founder Richard Stallman and Rakesh Sharma, the only Indian to date to travel in space. Former Afghan president Hamid Karzai was the guest of honour at the 2016 festival, which was scheduled to end with a musical evening.
