= IIT Kanpur =

Research Institute in Kanpur, India

Coordinates: 26.511383°N 80.23493°E

Indian Institute of Technology Kanpur
- Motto: Sanskrit: Tamaso mā jyotirgamaya
- Motto in English: From darkness, lead me to light
- Type: Public Institute of technology
- Established: 1959; 67 years ago
- Budget: ₹853 crore (US$91 million) (2025 - 2026)
- Chairman: Vacant
- Director: Manindra Agrawal
- Academic staff: 655
- Students: 8,346
- Undergraduates: 4,410
- Postgraduates: 1,808
- Doctoral students: 2,128
- Location: Kalyanpur, Uttar Pradesh, India
- Campus: Urban, 1,055 acres (427 ha)
- Colours: Blue & silver
- Nicknames: IITians, Kanpur-IITians
- Website: iitk.ac.in

The Indian Institute of Technology Kanpur (IIT- Kanpur or IIT-K) is a public institute of technology located in Kanpur, Uttar Pradesh, India. As an Indian Institute of Technology (IIT), it was declared an Institute of National Importance by the Government of India under the Institutes of Technology Act.

== History ==
IIT Kanpur was established by an Act of Parliament in 1960 by the Government of India. The institute was started in December 1959, initially in the campus of Harcourt Butler Technological Institute at Agricultural Gardens in Kanpur. In 1963, the institute moved to its present location, on the Grand Trunk Road near Kalyanpur locality in Kanpur district. The campus, which is planned and landscaped with the goal of environmental freedom, ease of movement and communication, was designed by Achyut Kanvinde.

During the first ten years of its existence, a consortium of nine US universities (namely MIT, University of California at Berkeley, California Institute of Technology, Princeton University, Carnegie Mellon University, University of Michigan, Ohio State University, Case Western Reserve University and Purdue University) helped set up IIT Kanpur's research laboratories and academic programmes under the Kanpur Indo-American Programme (KIAP). The first director of the institute was P. K. Kelkar (after whom the Central Library was renamed in 2002).

Under the guidance of economist John Kenneth Galbraith, IIT Kanpur was the first institute in India to offer Computer science education. The earliest computer course was started at the institute in August 1963 on an IBM 1620 system. The initiative for computer education came from the Electrical engineering department, then under the chairmanship of Prof. H.K. Kesavan, who was concurrently the chairman of Electrical Engineering and head of the Computer Centre. Prof. Harry Huskey of the University of California, Berkeley, who preceded Kesavan, helped with the computer activity at IIT-Kanpur. In 1971, the institute began an independent academic program in Computer Science and Engineering, leading to MTech and PhD degrees.

In 1972 the KIAP program ended, in part because of political tensions between India and Pakistan (as the USA supported Pakistan). Government funding was also reduced as a reaction to the sentiment that the IIT's were contributing to the brain drain.

The institute's annual technical festival, Techkriti, was first started in 1995.

== Campus ==
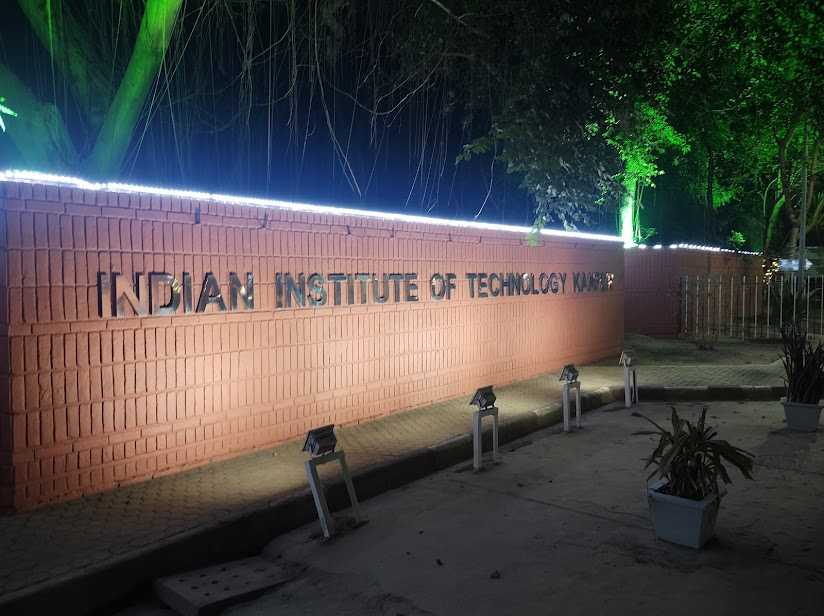
IIT Kanpur Entrance from GT Road

IIT Kanpur is located on the Grand Trunk Road, 15 kilometres (9.3 mi) west of Kanpur City and measures close to 420 hectares (1,000 acres). This land was donated by the Government of Uttar Pradesh in 1960 and by March 1963 the institute had moved to its current location.

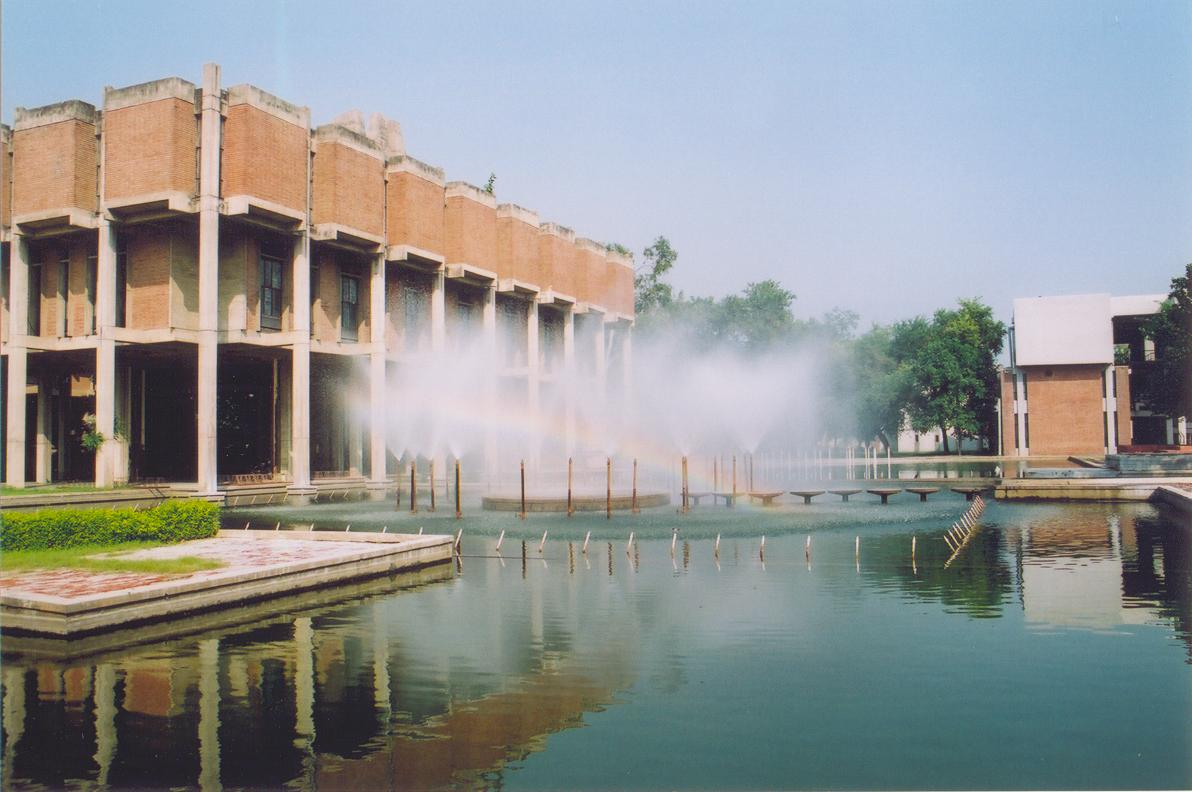
PK Kelkar Library

The institute has around 6478 students with 3938 undergraduate students and 2540 postgraduate students and about 500 research associates.

The academic area comprises the central library, departmental buildings, research centres, lecture hall complex, tutorial block and auditorium. The student hostels and other facilities like Student Activities Centre (SAC), Sports Complex lie outside the academic area. There are 15 Halls of Residence which are allotted to undergraduate, postgraduate and doctoral students. Additionally, married research scholars are allotted Single Bedroom Apartment (SBRA) facility on campus.

=== Noida Extension centre ===
IIT Kanpur has its Extension Centre in Noida with a small convention centre there for supporting outreach activities. Its foundation was laid on 4 December 2012 on 5 five acres of land allocated by Uttar Pradesh state government in the sector-62 of Noida city, which is less than an hour's journey from New Delhi and the Indira Gandhi International Airport. The cost of construction is estimated to be about 25 crores. The new campus will have an auditorium, seminar halls for organising national and international conferences and an International Relations Office along with a 7-storey guest house. Several short-term management courses and refresher courses meant for distance learning will be available at the extension center.

=== Transportation service ===
Being a major industrial town, Kanpur has good connectivity by rail and by road, but lags behind in terms of air connectivity. IIT Kanpur was suffering significantly in comparison to IIT Delhi and IIT Bombay due to this reason as far as visiting companies and other dignitaries are concerned. On 1 June 2013, a helicopter ferry service was started at IIT Kanpur run by Pawan Hans Helicopters Limited. In its initial run the service connects IIT Kanpur to Lucknow, but it is planned to later extend it to New Delhi. Currently there are two flights daily to and from Lucknow Airport with a duration of 25 minutes. Lucknow Airport operates both international and domestic flights to major cities. IIT Kanpur is the first academic institution in the country to provide such a service. The estimated charges are Rs. 6000 (US$100) per person. If anyone would like to avail the facility, he/she has to contact the Student Placement Office (SPO) at IIT Kanpur, since the helicopter service is subject to availability of chopper rights. The campus also has airstrips which allows flight workshops and joyrides for students. Currently Kanpur Airport has a domestic airport terminal at Chakeri, with flight connectivity to New Delhi, Mumbai, Pune, Chennai and Bengaluru airports.

The IIT campus has links to the Kanpur Metro at IIT Kanpur metro station. The Metro links the campus to Kanpur Central railway station.

=== New York Office ===
The institute has set up an office in New York with alumnus Sanjiv Khosla designated as the overseas brand ambassador of the institute. It is located at 62 William Street, Manhattan. The office aims to hunt for qualified and capable faculty abroad, facilitate internship opportunities in North American universities and be conduit for research tie ups with various US universities. The New York Office also tries to amass funds through the alumni based there. A system that invites students and faculty of foreign institutes to IIT Kanpur is also being formulated.

== Organisation and administration ==
=== Governance ===
All IITs follow the same organization structure which has the President of India as the visitor at the top of the hierarchy. Directly under the president is the IIT Council. Under the IIT Council is the board of governors of each IIT. Under the board of governors is the director, who is the chief academic and executive officer of the IIT. Under the director, in the organizational structure, comes the deputy director. Under the director and the deputy director, come the deans, the heads of various departments, and the registrar.

=== Departments ===
The academic departments at IIT Kanpur are:

Engineering	Humanities	Inter-Disciplinary
Aerospace Engineering; Biological Sciences and Bioengineering; Chemical Engineering; Civil Engineering; Computer Science and Engineering; Electrical Engineering; Materials Science and Engineering; Mechanical Engineering; Design; Sustainable Energy Engineering; Space, Planetary & Astronomical Sciences & Engineering; Intelligent Systems	Humanities and Social Sciences	Environmental Engineering and Management; Photonics Science and Engineering; Material Science; Nuclear Engineering and Technology
Sciences	Management	Economics
Mathematics and Statistics; Physics; Earth Sciences; Cognitive Science; Chemistry	Management Sciences	Economic Sciences

== Academics ==
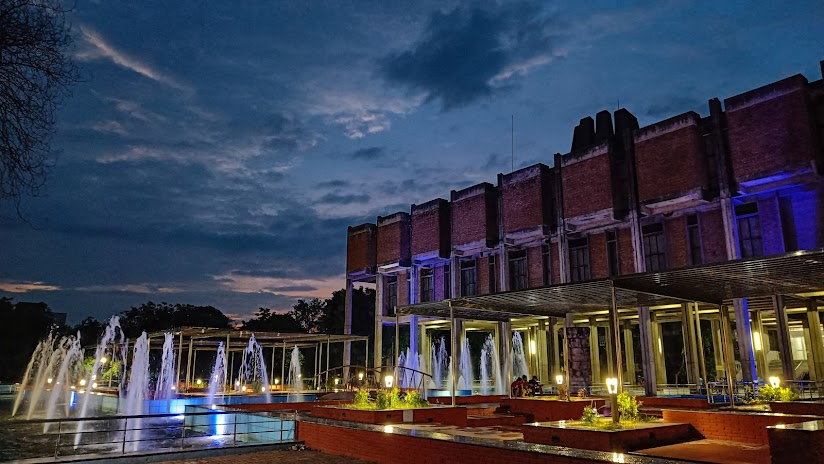
PK Kelkar Library, IIT Kanpur

=== Undergraduate ===
IIT Kanpur offers four-year B.Tech programs in aerospace engineering, biological sciences and bio-engineering, chemical engineering, civil engineering, computer science and engineering, electrical engineering, materials science and engineering and mechanical engineering. The admission to these programs is procured through Joint Entrance Examination. IITK offers admission only to bachelor's degree now (discontinuing the integrated course programs), but it can be extended by 1 year to make it integrated, depending on the choice of student and based on his/her performance there at undergraduate level. IIT Kanpur also offers four-year B.S. Programs in Pure and Applied Sciences (Mathematics, Physics and Chemistry in particular), Earth Science and Economics.

=== New academic system ===
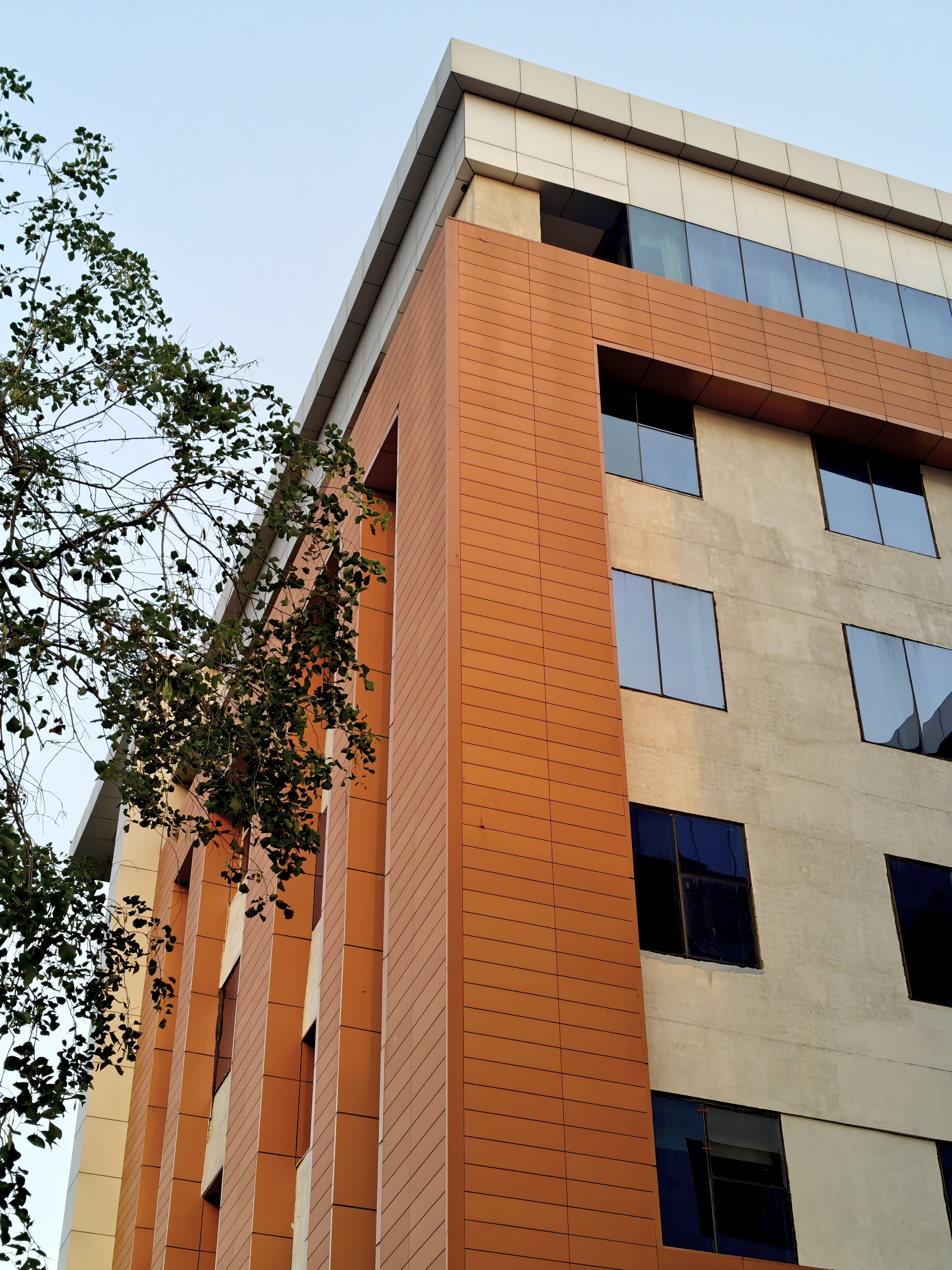
Engineering Sciences Building-2 IIT Kanpur

From 2011, IIT Kanpur has started offering a four-year BS program in sciences and has kept its BTech Program intact. Entry to the five-year MTech/MBA programs and Dual degree programme will be done based on the CPI of students instead of JEE rank. In order to reduce the number of student exams, IIT Kanpur has also abolished the earlier system of conducting two mid-term examinations. Instead, only two examinations (plus two quizzes in most courses depending on the instructor-in-charge, one before mid-semesters and the other after the mid-semesters and before the end-semesters examination), one between the semester and other towards the end of it would be held from the academic session starting July 2011 onward as per Academic Review Committee's recommendations.

=== Postgraduate ===
Postgraduate courses in Engineering offer Master of Technology (MTech), MS (R) and PhD(Doctor of Philosophy) degrees. The institute also offers two-tier MSc (Master of Science) courses in areas of basic sciences in which students are admitted through Joint Admission Test for MSc (JAM) exam. The institute also offers M.Des. (2 years), M.B.A. (2 years) and MSc (2 years) degrees. Admissions to MTech is made once a year through Graduate Aptitude Test in Engineering. Admissions to M. Des are made once a year through both Graduate Aptitude Test in Engineering (GATE) and Common Entrance Exam for Design (CEED). Until 2011, admissions to the M.B.A. program were accomplished through the Joint Management Entrance Test (JMET), held yearly, and followed by a Group Discussion/Personal Interview process. In 2011, JMET was replaced by Common Admission Test (CAT).

=== Admissions ===
Undergraduate admissions until 2012 were being done through the national-level Indian Institute of Technology Joint Entrance Examination (IIT-JEE). Following the Ministry of Human Resource Development's decision to replace IIT-JEE with a common engineering entrance examination, IIT Kanpur's admissions are now based on JEE (Joint Entrance Examination) -Advanced level along with other IITs.

Postgraduate admissions are made through the Graduate Aptitude Test in Engineering and Common Admission Test.

=== Rankings ===
University rankings

General – international
- QS (Asia) (2023): 66

General – India
- NIRF (Overall) (2024): 5
- NIRF (Research) (2024): 7

Engineering – India
- NIRF (2024): 4
- India Today (2022): 3
- Government colleges
- Outlook India (2022): 5

Business/Management – India
- NIRF (2024): 29

Internationally, IIT Kanpur was ranked 222nd in the world by the QS World University Rankings of 2026 and 6th in India.

IIT Kanpur was also ranked 5th in the overall category, 5th in Innovation Category, 7th among research institutions, 4th among engineering colleges and 29th among management schools in India by the National Institutional Ranking Framework (NIRF) in 2024. Outlook India ranked IIT Kanpur 5th among government engineering colleges In India Today Best Engineering Colleges 2024, IIT Kanpur was ranked 3rd.

== Centres and labs ==
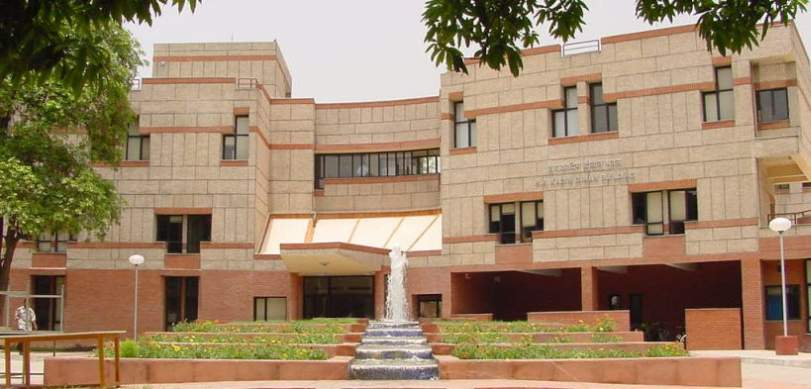
Department of Computer Science and Engineering at IIT Kanpur

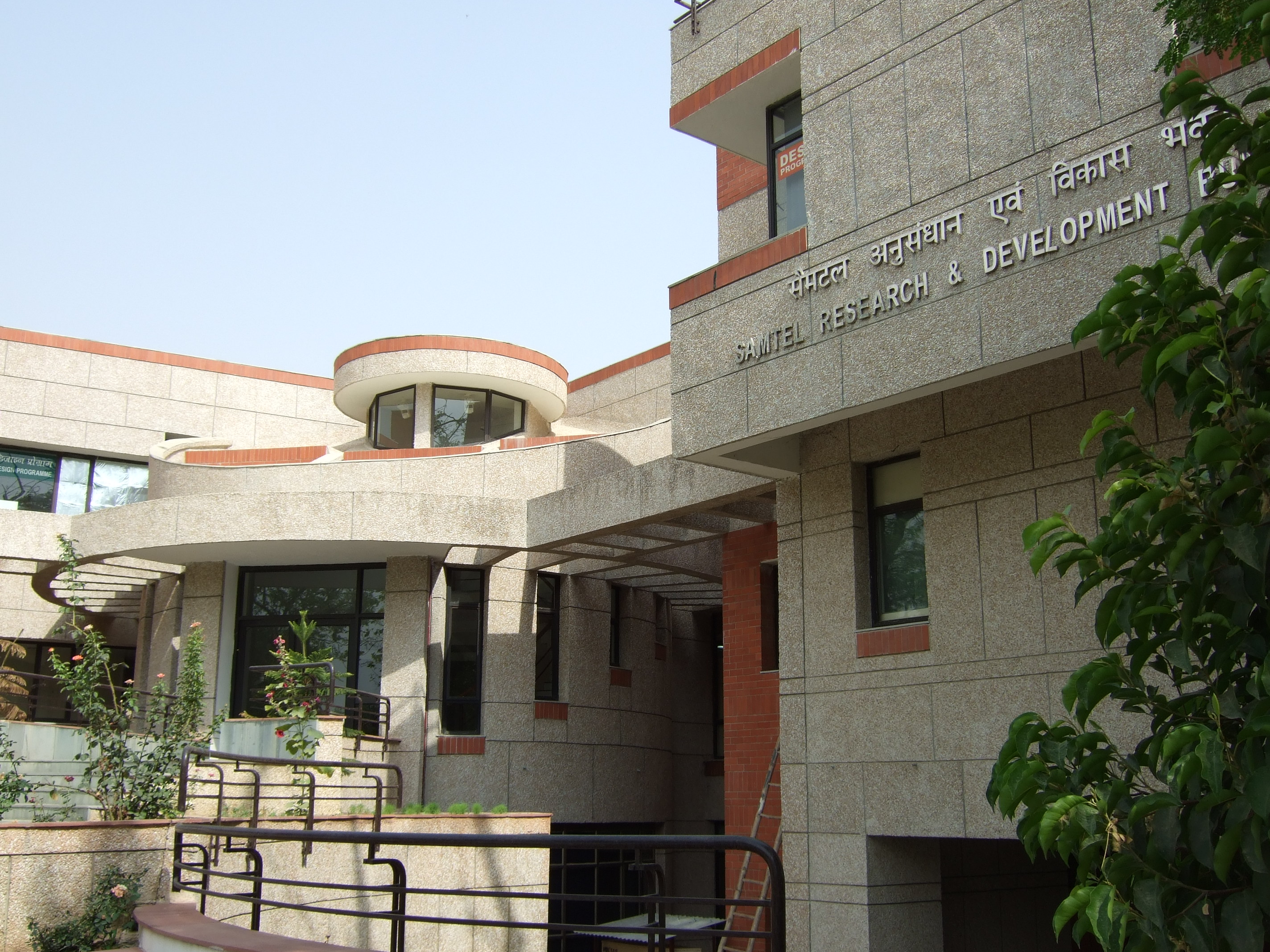
Samtel Research and Development Building

The campus is spread over an area of 4.3 square kilometres (1,100 acres). The institute has its own airfield for flight testing and gliding. The departments have their own libraries, laboratories and research facilities including the National Wind Tunnel Facility.

Research centres at IIT Kanpur include:

- Advanced Centre for Electronic Systems (ACES)
- Advanced Centre for Material Science (ACMS)
- Centre for Environmental Science and Engineering
- Centre for Ganga River Basin Management and Studies
- Centre for Lasers and Photonics
- Centre for Mechatronics
- Centre for Nanosciences
- Centre for Technology for Sustainable Development
- DIA Centre for Excellence
- Interdisciplinary Centre for Cyber Security and Cyber Defense of Critical Infrastructures
- Mehta Family Centre for Engineering in Medicine
- National Information Centre of Earthquake Engineering
- Prabhu Goel Research Centre for Computer and Internet Security
- Samtel Centre for Display Technologies

PK Kelkar Library (formerly Central Library) is an academic library of the institute with a collection of more than 300,000 volumes, and subscriptions to more than 1,000 periodicals. The library was renamed to its present name in 2003 after Dr. P K Kelkar, the first director of the institute. It is housed in a three-story building, with a total floor area of 6973 square metres. The Abstracting and Indexing periodicals, Microform and CD-ROM databases, technical reports, Standards and thesis are in the library. Each year, about 4,500 books and journal volumes are added to the library.

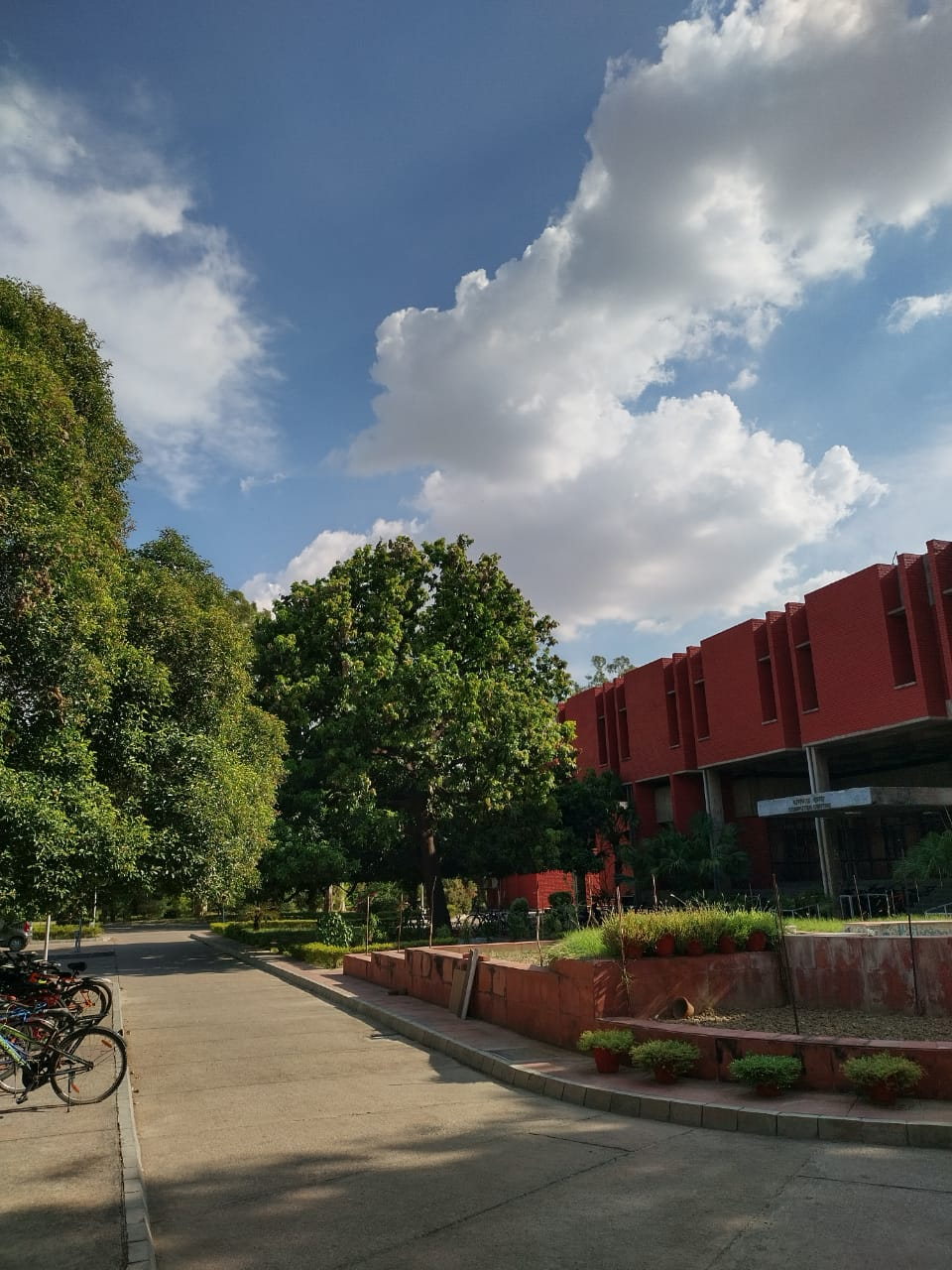
The Computer Center

The New Core Labs (NCL) is 3-storey building with state of the art physics and chemistry laboratories for courses in the first year. The New Core Labs also has Linux and Windows computer labs for the use of first year courses and a Mathematics department laboratory housing machines with high computing power.

=== Computer Centre ===
The Computer Centre hosts the IIT Kanpur website and provides personal web space for students and faculties. It also provides a spam filtered email server and high speed fibre optic Internet to all the hostels and the academic areas. Users have multiple options to choose among various interfaces to access mail service. It has Linux and windows laboratories equipped with dozens of high-end software like MATLAB, Autocad, Ansys, Abaqus etc. for use of students. Apart from departmental computer labs, computer centre hosts more than 300 Linux terminals and more than 100 Windows terminals and is continuously available to the students for academic work and recreation. Computer centre has recently adopted an open source software policy for its infrastructure and computing. Various high-end compute and GPU servers are remotely available from data centre for user computation.

The computer centre has multiple super computing clusters for research and teaching activity. In June 2014 IIT Kanpur launched their second supercomputer which is India's fifth most powerful supercomputer as of now. The new supercomputer 'Cluster Platform SL230s Gen8' manufactured by Hewlett-Packard has 15,360 cores and a theoretical peak (Rpeak) 307.2 TFlop/s and is the world's 192nd most powerful supercomputer as of June 2015.

=== ŚIKṢĀ: Study Centre for Indian Knowledge System for Holistic Advancement ===
The mission of the ŚIKṢĀ Centre for Indian Knowledge System at IIT Kanpur is to promote, facilitate, and benefit from IKS-related studies, research, content development and outreach. The vision of the Centre is to establish IITK at the forefront of IKS studies in the world.

=== Hypersonic Experimental Aerodynamics Laboratory ===
In February 2024, IIT Kanpur built and evaluated the Hypervelocity Expansion Tunnel Test Facility, referred to as S2, in the Department of Aerospace Engineering's Hypersonic Experimental Aerodynamics Laboratory (HEAL). Ballistic missile launches, scramjet flights, and extreme hypersonic conditions of atmospheric entry can all be replicated at the S2 facility. It is anticipated that the facility will support ISRO and DRDO's Hypersonic Technology Demonstrator Vehicle, RLV Technology Demonstration Programme, and Gaganyaan. The facility can generating flight speeds between Mach 8 to 29.

== Research ==
=== IIT Kanpur Faculty & Research (IRINS Data) ===
- Faculty / Scientist (Total 534): Professor: 142, Associate Professor: 106, Assistant Professor: 189, Professor (HAG): 57, Assistant Professor (Grade-I): 35, Assistant Professor (Grade-II): 5
- Publications & Patents: Total Publications: 25,824. Journal Articles: 17,466. Conference / In Proceedings: 5,501. Books / Chapters: 923. Other: 1,934. Open Access: Gold 1,767 | Green 797 | Bronze 2,343. Patents: 459. Impact: Total Impact: 557,990. Citations: 487,787.

=== Top Faculty Profiles (by publications) ===
- Dr Swagata Mukherjee, Asst. Prof – 1,298 publications
- Dr Yogesh Singh Chauhan, Prof – 454 publications
- Prof Sri Niwas Singh, Prof (HAG) – 432 publications

=== Top 10 Scholars (by publications & projects) ===
- Dr Swagata Mukherjee – 1,298 publications
- Prof Vijaya R – 165 publications
- Prof Bushra Ateeq – 91 publications

Research is controlled by the Office of the Dean of Research and Development (DoRD). Under the aegis of the Office the students publish the quarterly NERD Magazine (Notes on Engineering Research and Development) which publishes scientific and technical content created by students. Articles may be original work done by students in the form of hobby projects, term projects, internships, or theses. Articles of general interest which are informative but do not reflect original work are also accepted. The institute is part of the European Research and Education Collaboration with Asia (EURECA) programme since 2008.

=== Defense ===
Assisting the Indian Ordnance Factories in not only upgrading existing products, but also developing new weapon platforms.

On November 26, 2024, IIT Kanpur introduced Anālakṣhya, a Meta-material Surface Cloaking System (MSCS) for multi-spectral camouflage capabilities. In collaboration with Mr. Gagandeep Singh, Dr. Kajal Chowdhary, and Dr. Abhinav Bhardwaj, Professors Anantha Ramakrishna from the Department of Physics, Kumar Vaibhav Srivastava from the Department of Electrical Engineering, and J. Ramkumar from the Department of Mechanical Engineering at IIT Kanpur came up with the idea for the Anālakṣhya MSCS. This broadband Meta-material Microwave Absorber improves stealth capabilities against Synthetic Aperture Radar (SAR) imaging by wave absorption across a wide spectrum. Additionally, it provides great defense against radar-guided missiles. From 2019 to 2024, it was tested in both lab and field settings under various circumstances. Meta Tattva Systems is the licensee of the technology for industrial production and is currently under acquisition by the Indian Armed Forces. This technology is of interest to DRDO for AMCA development.

=== Jugnu ===
The students of IIT Kanpur made a nano satellite called Jugnu, which was given by president Pratibha Patil to ISRO for launch. Jugnu is a remote sensing satellite which will be operated by the Indian Institute of Technology Kanpur. It is a nanosatellite which will be used to provide data for agriculture and disaster monitoring. It is a 3-kilogram (6.6lb) spacecraft, which measures 34 centimetres (13 in) in length by 10 centimetres (3.9 in) in height and width. Its development programme cost around 25 million rupees. It has a design life of one year. Jugnu's primary instrument is the Micro Imaging System, a near infrared camera which will be used to observe vegetation. It also carries a GPS receiver to aid tracking, and is intended to demonstrate a microelectromechanical inertial measurement unit.

=== Programming club ===
The Programming Club at IITK is a club in the SNT council and is a well known programming club in India. The club is made up of 4 coordinators, 4 LSTMs, and 27 secretaries.

=== IITK Motorsports ===
IITK motorsports is the biggest and most comprehensive student initiative of the college, founded in October 2010. It is a group of students from varied disciplines who aim at designing and fabricating a Formula-style race car for international Formula SAE (Society of Automotive Engineers) events. Most of the components of the car, except the engine, tyres and wheel rims, are designed and manufactured by the team members themselves. The car is designed to provide maximum performance under the constraints of the event, while ensuring the drivability, reliability, driver safety and aesthetics of the car are not compromised. The team has participated in following competitions since its inception:

Background shading indicates that the competition is currently in progress.

IITK MOTORSPORTS COMPETITIONS
Competition	Remarks
Formula SAE Italy 2013	2nd Best Indian Team; 9th in Business Plan Presentation Event; 13th in Cost Presentation Events
BAJA Student India 2015	Awarded ‘Best Incoming Team’ 4th in Design Event; 6th in Acceleration Event
FORMULA BHARAT 2016	India’s Lightest Formula Race Car; 8th Position Overall; 4th in Business Logic; 6th in Design Event
BAJA Student India 2016	Awarded ‘Best Tech-Ready Team’ 13th Overall Position; 4th Acceleration; 4th Maneuverability; 6th Design Event
Formula Bharat 2018	15th Position Overall; 6th Business Plan Presentation Event; 9th Design Event
Mega ATV Championship 2019	13th Overall Position; 12th Endurance Event
Formula Bharat 2023 Class I EV	1st Position Overall; 1st Business Plan Presentation Event; 4th Concept Resource Management Report
Formula Bharat 2024	14th Position Overall
FORMULA IMPERIAL 2024	OVERALL EV CHAMPIONS; Best Business Plan; Best Engineering Design; Best Innovation Award; People’s Choice Award; Future Award; Runner-Up in Cost and Manufacturing
FORMULA Bharat 2025	Overall 9th in EV category Top 5 in MathWorks Simulation Challenge; Finalist in Cost Report Event
SUPRA SAEINDIA 2025	OVERALL 5TH IN EV CATEGORY; 1st in Cost Event; 3rd in Business Report
FORMULA Bharat 2026	Secured 1st place in rulebook quiz of Formula Bharat 2026

=== Maraal UAVs ===
Researchers at IIT Kanpur have developed a series of solar powered UAVs named MARAAL-1 & MARAAL-2. Development of Maraal is notable as it is the first solar powered UAV developed in India. Maraal-2 is fully indigenous.

== Student life ==
=== National events ===
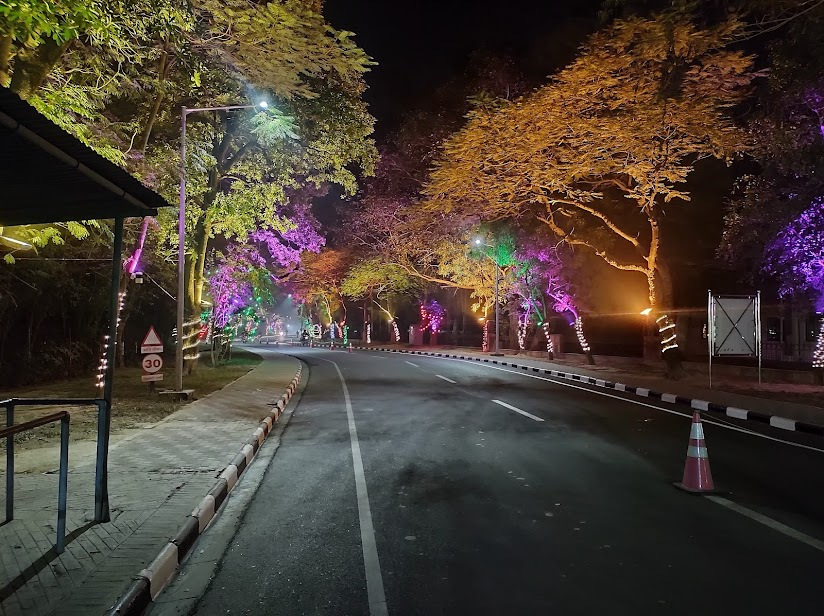
IIT Kanpur During Diwali

- Antaragni: The annual cultural festival of IIT Kanpur, which was started in 1965, is held in October every year. The festival includes musical performances, dramas, literary games, folk dances, fashion shows and quizzes.
- Techkriti: The annual four-day inter-collegiate technical and entrepreneurship festival usually held in March. It was started in 1995 with an aim to encourage interest and innovation in technology among students and to provide a platform for industry and academia to interact. Megabucks (a business and entrepreneurship festival) used to be held independently but was later merged with Techkriti in 2010. Notable speakers at Techkriti include APJ Abdul Kalam, Vladimir Voevodsky, Douglas Osheroff, Oliver Smithies, Rakesh Sharma, David Griffiths and Richard Stallman.
- Udghosh: IIT Kanpur's annual sports festival usually held in September. It started in 2004 as an inter-college sports meet organised by the institute. Udghosh involves students from across India competing in the university's sports facilities. The festival includes motivational talks, a mini-marathon, gymnastic shows, and sport quizzes related to various sports events.
- Vivekananda Youth Leadership Convention: An annual convention organised on the birth anniversary of Swami Vivekananda by Vivekananda Samiti, under Students Gymkhana with a focus on leadership, social innovation, and youth empowerment among students. The convention has included Kiran Bedi, Bana Singh, Yogendra Singh Yadav, Raju Narayana Swamy, Arunima Sinha, Rajendra Singh and other personalities from different fields in previous years.
- E-Summit: Started in 2013 as the flagship event of Entrepreneurship Cell, IIT Kanpur, E-Summit is held annually for three days to promote entrepreneurship among students. It consists of various competitions, workshops and talks by eminent personalities in the domains of venture capital, product design and social entrepreneurship.

=== Students' Gymkhana ===
The Students' Gymkhana is the students' government organization of IIT Kanpur, established in 1962.

The Students' Gymkhana functions mainly through the Students' Senate, an elected student representative body composed of senators elected from each batch and the six elected executives:

- President, Students' Gymkhana.
- General Secretary, Media and Culture.
- General Secretary, Games and Sports.
- General Secretary, Science and Technology.
- General Secretary (UG), Academics and Career
- General Secretary (PG), Academics and Career

The number of senators in the Students' Senate is around 50–55. A senator is elected for every 150 students of IIT Kanpur.

The meetings of the Students' Senate are chaired by the chairperson, Students' Senate, who is elected by the Senate. The Senate lays down the guidelines for the functions of the executives, their associated councils, the Gymkhana Festivals and other matters pertaining to the Student body at large.

The Students' Senate has a say in the policy and decision-making bodies of the institute. The president, Students' Gymkhana and the chairperson, Students' Senate are among the special invitees to the Institute Academic Senate. The president is usually invited to the meetings of the board of governors when matters affecting students are being discussed. Nominees of the Students' Senate are also members of the various standing Committees of the Institute Senate including the disciplinary committee, the Undergraduate and Postgraduate committee, etc. All academic departments have Departmental Undergraduate and Post Graduate Committees consisting of members of the faculty and student nominees.

== See also ==
- Indian Institutes of Technology
- Institutes of National Importance
- Indian Institute of Information Technology, Allahabad
- Indian Institute of Technology Varanasi
- Harcourt Butler Technical University
