= Bithoor =

Bithoor Brahmavart
- town
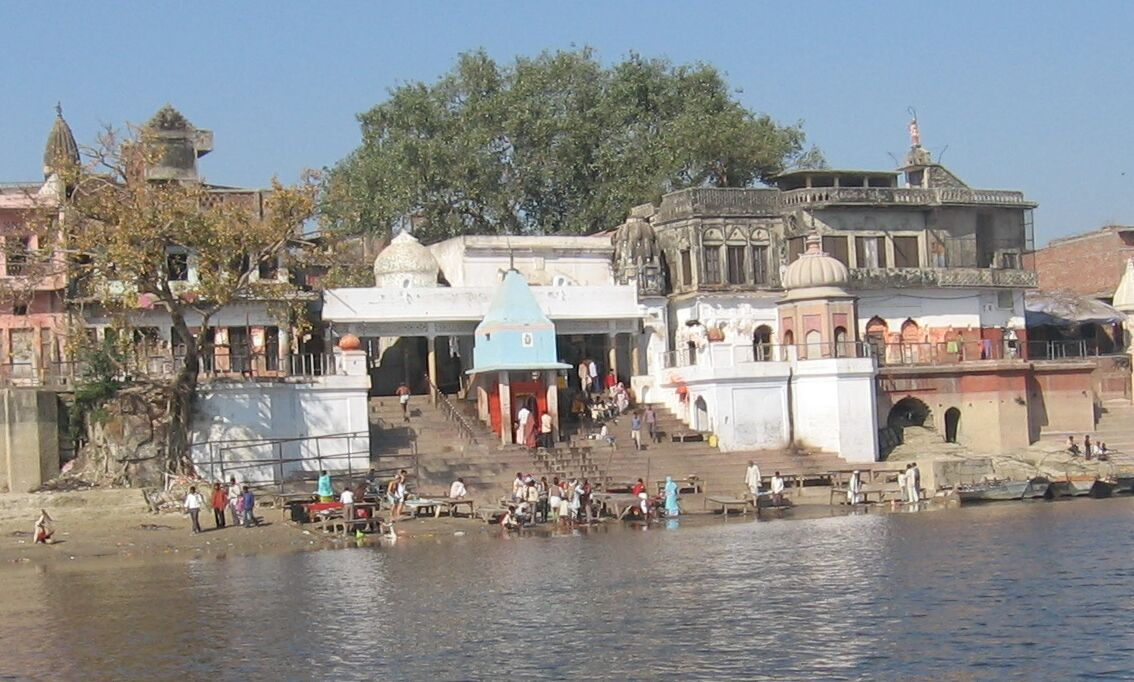
- Brahmavart Ghat; Picture taken on Shivaratri day shows the pilgrims about to start their two-day austerity trek.

- Location in Uttar Pradesh, India
- Coordinates: 26.6127°N 80.2719°E
- Country: India
- State: Uttar Pradesh
- District: Kanpur Nagar

Government
  - Type: Local government
  - Body: Town Area
  - MLA: Abhijit Sanga Singh

Population (2025)
  - Total: 49,647

Languages
  - Official: Hindi, English
- Time zone: UTC+5:30 (IST)
- Telephone code: 0512
- Vehicle registration: UP-78
- Website: Official Website

Bithoor or Bithur is a town in Kanpur district, 25 km (15mi) by road north of the centre of Kanpur city, in Uttar Pradesh, India. Bithoor is situated on the right bank of the River Ganges, and is a centre of Hindu pilgrimage. Bithoor is also the centre for War of Independence of 1857 as Nana Sahib, a popular freedom fighter who was based there. The city is enlisted as a municipality of Kanpur metropolitan area.

== History ==
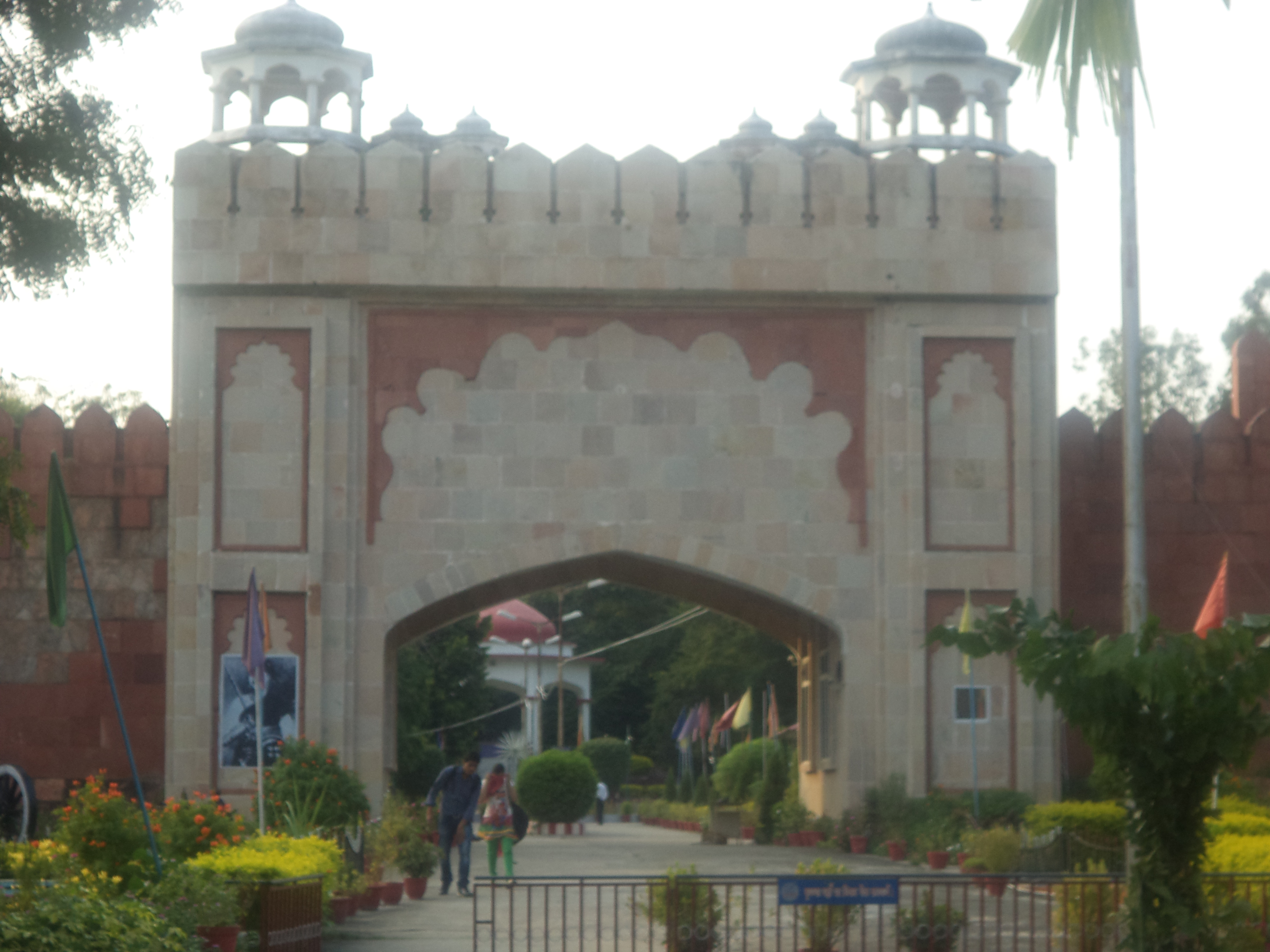
Nana Sahib memorial at Bithoor, which previously had their fort

Nana Saheb Peshwa II Statue at Nana Rao Sahab Park, Bithoor, Kanpur

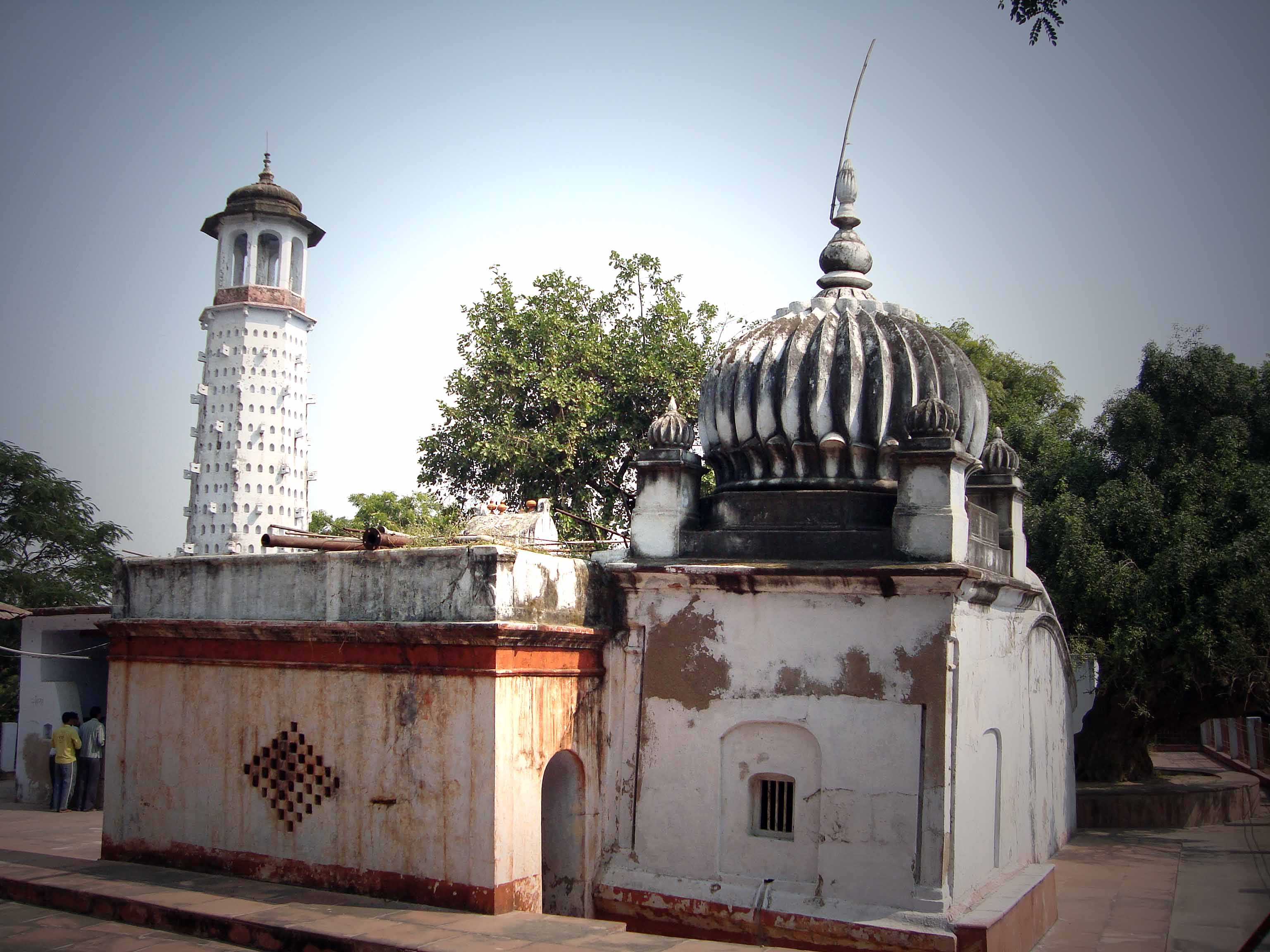
A temple of goddess Sita in Bithoor, where according to mythology, she left for her heavenly abode by entering into the earth.

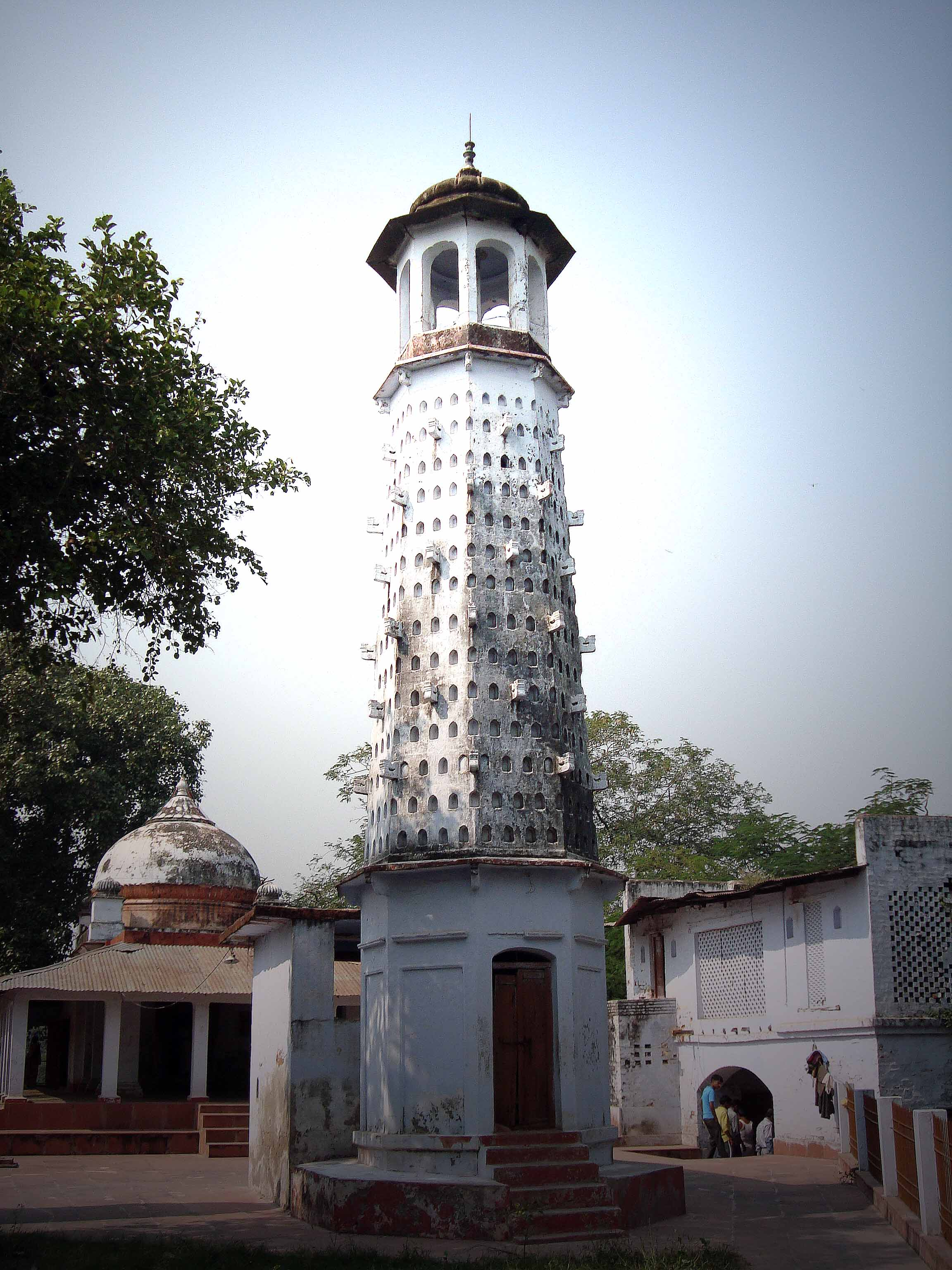
An old minaret built by the Peshwa of Bithoor Baji Rao II

Bithoor, historically known as Utpalaranya, has roots in Hindu mythology and ancient Indian history. According to Hindu belief, Lord Brahma came to Utpalaranya, where he performed an Ashwamedha yagna. On completion of the ritual, the forests of Utpalaranya became known as brahmavarta, from which the modern name Bithoor is derived.

Bithur was listed in the Ain-i Akbari (c. 1595) as a mahal under sarkar Kannauj. It was listed with an assessed revenue of 2,921,389 dams and was expected to supply 5,000 infantry and 300 cavalry to the Mughal army.

Bithoor has been closely associated with the Indian independence movement, especially with the Indian Rebellion of 1857. It was at one time home to many of the rebellion's most prominent participants, including the Rani of Jhansi, Lakshmi Bai. During the British Raj, Bithoor was part of Cawnpore district (now Kanpur) in the United Provinces. The last of the Peshwas, Baji Rao II, was banished to Bithur; his adopted son, Nana Sahib, made the town his headquarters. Bithur was captured by General Havelock on 19 July 1857. The town was subsequently attacked and occupied by the British, who razed Nana Sahib's palace and the temples in the town in retaliation for the brutal massacre of over 300 British men, women and children who had been lured out of their defences at Cawnpore by a group of Indian rebels with a promise of truce during the Siege of Cawnpore. Angered British troops also carried out numerous reprisals against the citizenry of Bithoor, including anyone suspected of being involved in the rebellion. Numerous private houses in Bithoor were also looted and burnt.

== Geography ==
Bithoor is situated on the southern bank of river Ganga in Kanpur Nagar district, Uttar Pradesh. The area lies within the Ganga basin and consists of alluvial deposits containing sand, silt and clay.

Bithoor has a tropical climate with hot and dry summer from April to June/July with mean maximum temperature around 41°C (105°F). Winter is from mid- November to February with temperature averaging 8.5°C (47.3°F). The rainy season extends from June to September with average rainfall of 177mm.

== Ecology and biodiversity ==
Bithoor has a diverse natural ecosystem along the Ganga river basin.

=== Flora ===
The local vegetative cover is dominated by planted trees along with naturally growing flora. These trees are fruit, flower and seed bearing. The key tree species in the area are Tectona grandis(Teak), Dalbergia sissoo(Shisham), Terminalia arjuna (Arjun), Acacia arabica(Babool), Madhuca indica(Mahua), Ficus religiosa(Peepal), Ficus benghalensis(Bargad), Mangifera indica(Mango) and Syzygium cumini(Jamun).

==== Fauna ====
Due to local urban development and high human activity, wild animals are absent in Bithoor.

The town's bird (avifauna) diversity is high, supported by nesting habitats in fruiting trees, ritual food offerings from pilgrims, and river resources. Commonly observed bird species include Red-wattled Lapwing(Vanellus indicus), Cattle Egret (Bubulcus ibis), Red-vented Bulbul (Pycnonotus cafer), Comman Crow (Corvus spendens), Comman Myna (Acridotheres tristis), Indian Roller (Coracias benghalensis).

The wetlands and river stretches in Bithoor are host to visiting migratory birds and local vaders like Red-beasted Flycatcher (Ficedula parva), Black-winged Stilt (Himantopus), Pond Heron (Ardeola grayii), and Pied Kingfisher (Ceryle rudis).

== Demographics ==
Bithoor is a Nagar Panchayat city in the district of Kanpur Nagar, Uttar Pradesh. The Bithoor city is divided into 10 wards for which elections are held every 5 years. As of 2001 India census, Bithoor had a population of 9647. Males constitute 55% of the population and females 45%. Bithoor has an average literacy rate of 62%, higher than the national average of 59.5%; the male literacy rate is 70% and female literacy rate is 53%. 13% of the population is under 6 years of age. Bithoor Nagar Panchayat has a population of 11,300, of which 6,088 are males while 5,212 are females, as per report released by Census India in 2011.The population of children aged 0-6 is 1337 which is 11.83% of the total population of Bithoor (NP). In Bithoor Nagar Panchayat, the female sex ratio is 856 against state average of 912. Moreover, the child sex ratio in Bithoor is around 860 compared to the Uttar Pradesh state average of 902. The literacy rate of Bithoor city is 80.61% higher than the state average of 67.68%. In Bithoor, male literacy is around 86.01% while the female literacy rate is 74.29%. Bithoor Nagar Panchayat has a total administration over 1,999 houses to which it supplies basic amenities like water and sewerage. It is also authorized to build roads within the Nagar Panchayat limits and impose taxes on properties coming under its jurisdiction.

Religion

Hindus comprise the majority of the population of Bithoor, accounting for 89.54% of the total population, followed by Muslims who comprise 10.19%. Christians and Sikhs are in the minority and are only found in pockets of the city.

Ethnic communities

The majority of Bithoor people are from Uttar Pradesh, though there is a significant Marathi population in the city. The descendants of the migrant Marathi families who settled at Bithoor have not only lived in Bithoor for more than three generations, but many of them own sizable amounts of land and other immovable properties. The first five families, which came with Nana Saheb were: Moghe, Pinge, Sehajwalkar, Hardekar and Sapre. The majority of them settled in Bithoor or adjoining places.

== Notable landmarks ==
Valmiki Ashram

Some of the most significant moments of Hindu religion and mythology are said to have occurred here, as being the place of the forest-rendezvous of Sita after Lord Rama left her, the birthplace of Lav and Kush, and the site where the Ramayana was written.

Brahmavart Ghat

This is the holiest of the holy ghats of Bithoor. The disciples of Lord Brahma pray at the altar of the 'Wooden Slippers' after a ritual bath. Later, Brahma installed a Shiva-linga which is still worshipped as Brahmeshwar Mahadeva at the principal ghat of Bithoor, the Brahmavarta Ghat. A nail of the horseshoe embedded in the steps of the Ghat is an object of special reverence for devotees, as it is considered to be of Brahma's horse, while it was going for the Ashwamedha Yajna. This is also known as the place from where Lord Brahma began the creation of mankind, according to Hindu mythology On the completion of the yajna, the forests of Utpalaranya became known as Brahmavarta, from which the popular name, Bithoor is derived. The Hindu Sant Shri Hit Premanand Govind Sharan Ji Maharaj also stayed here during his initial tapasya days, right along the banks of Ganga. Here he took the vow never to leave the banks of Ganga and eat to whatever came to him without asking anybody, by Mahadev's grace.

Patthar Ghat

The redstone ghat whose foundation stone was laid by the minister of Avadh, Tikait Rai, is a symbol of incomparable art and architecture. There is a massive Shiv temple where the Shivling is made of 'Kasaauti' stone.

Dhruva Teela

In later centuries, Brahmavarta flourished as a capital of the kingdom of Utpalaranya, over which ruled the emperor Uttanpad. His son Dhruva performed penance here in order to please Lord Vishnu. Lord was so pleased that he not only appeared but granted him a divine boon—to shine for all time to come as a star. This place is therefore known as Dhruva Teela.

ISKCON Temple, Kanpur

ISKCON Temple, Kanpur, is a part of the International Society for Krishna Consciousness (ISKCON) movement.

Siddhidham Ashram

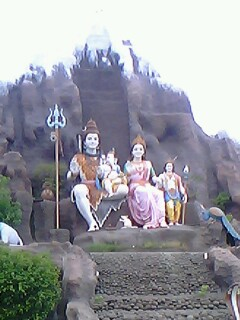
Artificial Kailash Mountain at Siddhidham Ashram

Siddidham Ashram, also known as Sudhanshu ji Maharaj Ashram, is under "Vishva Shanti Mission", an organisation run by Sudhanshu ji Maharaj. It is situated on Bithoor road. The ashram has a big campus. There is also a Radha Krishna temple and an artificial Kailash Mountain.

Apart from these, there are some other landmarks as well, such as the Ram Janki temple, Lav-Kush temple, Sai Baba temple, Haridham Ashram, Jahangir Mosque and Nana Saheb Smarak.

== Sanitation ==
Bithoor hosts a large number of pilgrims, for holy baths in the river Ganga, and religious congregations. Historically, the town lacked a municipal sewerage system, resulting in domestic wastewater discharging directly into the Ganga river. Under the National Ganga River Basin Authority (NGRBA) Mission, a plan was proposed for laying down of municipal sewerage system, so that no untreated domestic wastewater be discharged directly into the Ganga river.

== Transport ==
Airways

The nearest airport is at Chakeri situated 44 kilometres from Bithoor and one and a half hours drive from Bithoor. The proposed Rasoolabad International Airport is at a distance of 33 km from Bithoor.

Railways

The Brahmavarta station situated near Ganges river. The nearest major railway station is Kanpur Central situated about 23 kilometres and one hours drive from Bithoor.

Roadways

Bithoor doesn't has its own Bus Station but KMBS connected it various localities of Kanpur.

== In popular culture ==
- Sultan starring Salman Khan and Anushka Sharma was shot in Bithoor.
- Mungerilal B. Tech is also scheduled to be shot at Bithoor.

== See also ==
- Bithoor (Vidhan Sabha constituency)
