= Riverwalk =

Riverwalk may refer to:

== Paths and trails ==
=== Australia ===
- Brisbane Riverwalk
- Surfers Riverwalk, Gold Coast

=== Canada ===
- Jack and Jean Leslie RiverWalk, in Downtown Calgary, Alberta

=== Mexico ===
- Santa Lucía riverwalk in Monterrey, Nuevo León

=== United States ===
- Blue Water River Walk, in Port Huron, Michigan
- Bradenton Riverwalk, Florida
- Chattahoochee RiverWalk, in Columbus, Georgia
- Chicago Riverwalk, Illinois
- Detroit River Walk, Michigan
- Riverwalk (Fort Lauderdale), Florida
- Hackensack RiverWalk, in Hudson County, New Jersey
- Historic Arkansas Riverwalk, in Pueblo, Colorado
- Jacksonville Riverwalks, Florida
- Miami Riverwalk, Florida
  - Riverwalk station
- Milwaukee Riverwalk, Wisconsin
- Naperville River Walk, Illinois
- Portland Riverwalk, in Ionia County, Michigan
- Riverwalk in Reno, Nevada
- Riverwalk Augusta in Augusta, Georgia
- Riverwalk Trail, part of the Louisville Loop in Louisville, Kentucky
- Riverwalk, a part of Waterplace Park in Providence, Rhode Island
- San Antonio River Walk, Texas
  - San Antonio Downtown and River Walk Historic District
- Tampa Riverwalk, Florida
- Tennessee Riverwalk, in Chattanooga, Tennessee

== Other uses ==
- The Outlet Collection at Riverwalk, a mall in New Orleans, Louisiana, U.S.
- Dabos Park, minor league ballpark in Alabama, U.S. formerly known as Montgomery Riverwalk Stadium
- Operation River Walk, a coalition military operation of the Iraq War
- Riverwalk (album), by Lara & Reyes, 1998
- Riverwalk Kitakyūshū, a shopping centre in Japan
- River Walk (Manhattan), an unbuilt development project in New York City, U.S.
- Yodpiman Riverwalk, a community mall in Bangkok, Thailand

== See also ==
- Boardwalk, an elevated footpath or causeway built with wood
- Esplanade, an open area for walking next to a river or large body of water
- Riverfront, a region along a river
- Hudson River Waterfront Walkway, in New Jersey, U.S.
- The Park at River Walk, or River Walk Park, Bakersfield, California, U.S.
