= Riverfront =

Region along a river

A riverfront is a "land or area along a river," often in larger cities that are traversed or bordered by one or more rivers or canals. The riverfronts are mostly lined with marinas, docks, cafes, museums, parks, or minor attractions. In the late 20th and 21st centuries, many riverfronts are a staple of modernism, economic development, environmental preservation, and city beautification.

== List of riverfronts in Asia ==
=== India ===
List of riverfronts in India
Name of riverfront	City	State
Brahmaputra Riverfront	Guwahati	Assam
Sabarmati Riverfront	Ahmedabad	Gujarat
Pune Riverfront	Pune	Maharashtra
Chambal Riverfront	Kota	Rajasthan
Tapi Riverfront	Surat	Gujarat
Hooghly Riverfront	Kolkata	West Bengal
Gomti Riverfront	Lucknow	Uttar Pradesh
River Yamuna	Agra	Uttar Pradesh
Har ki Pauri	Haridwar	Uttarakhand
Daman Ganga Riverfront	Silvassa	Dadra and Nagar Haveli
Musi Riverfront	Hyderabad	Telangana
Rangmati Riverfront	Jamnagar	Gujarat

=== Japan ===
List of riverfronts in Japan
Name of riverfront	City	Prefecture
Sumida	Tokyo	

=== China ===
List of riverfronts in China
Name of riverfront	City	Province
the Bund		Shanghai
		Beijing
		Fujian
		Guangdong

=== Pakistan ===
List of riverfronts in Pakistan
Name of riverfront	City/District	Province
Ravi Riverfront (Under Construction since 2020)	Lahore District	Pakistani Punjab

== List of riverfronts in Europe ==
=== Finland ===
List of riverfronts in Finland
Name of riverfront	City	Region
Porvoo River	Porvoo	Uusimaa

=== Poland ===
List of riverfronts in Poland
Name of riverfront	City	Voivodeships
Riverfront in Cracow	Kraków	Lesser Poland

=== Germany ===
List of riverfronts in Germany
Name of riverfront	City	Bundesland
Rheinuferpromenade	Düsseldorf	North Rhine-Westphalia

== List of riverfronts in North America ==
=== United States of America ===
List of riverfronts in United States of America
Name of riverfront	City	State
Chicago Riverwalk	Chicago	Illinois
Detroit International Riverfront	Detroit	Michigan
San Antonio River Walk	San Antonio	Texas

== List of riverfronts in South America ==
Belem, Brazil

== List of riverfronts in Oceania ==
=== Australia ===
List of riverfronts in Australia
Name of riverfront	City	State
River Torrens	Adelaide	South Australia

== Images ==
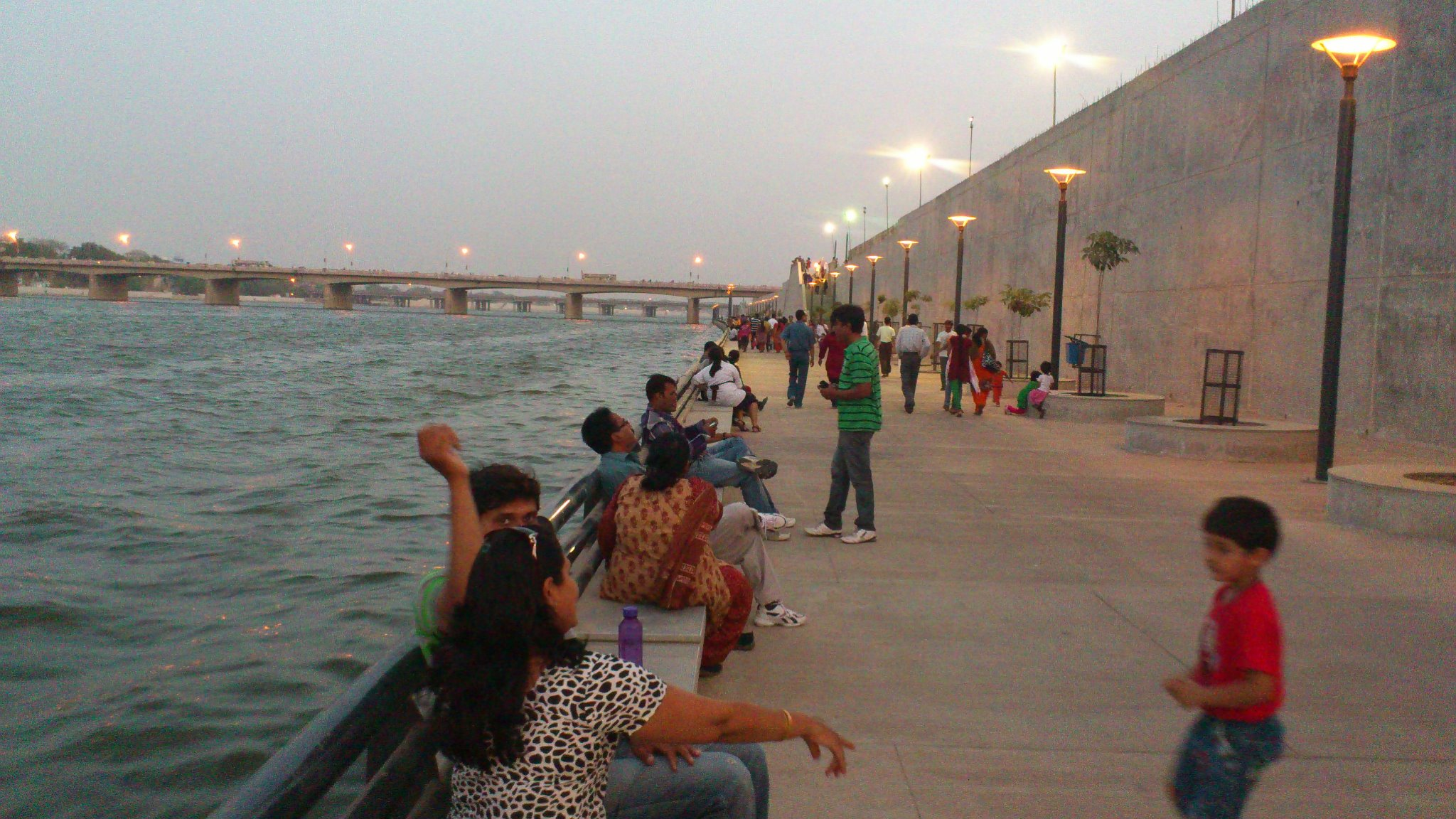
View of Sabarmati Riverfront in Ahmedabad, May 2012

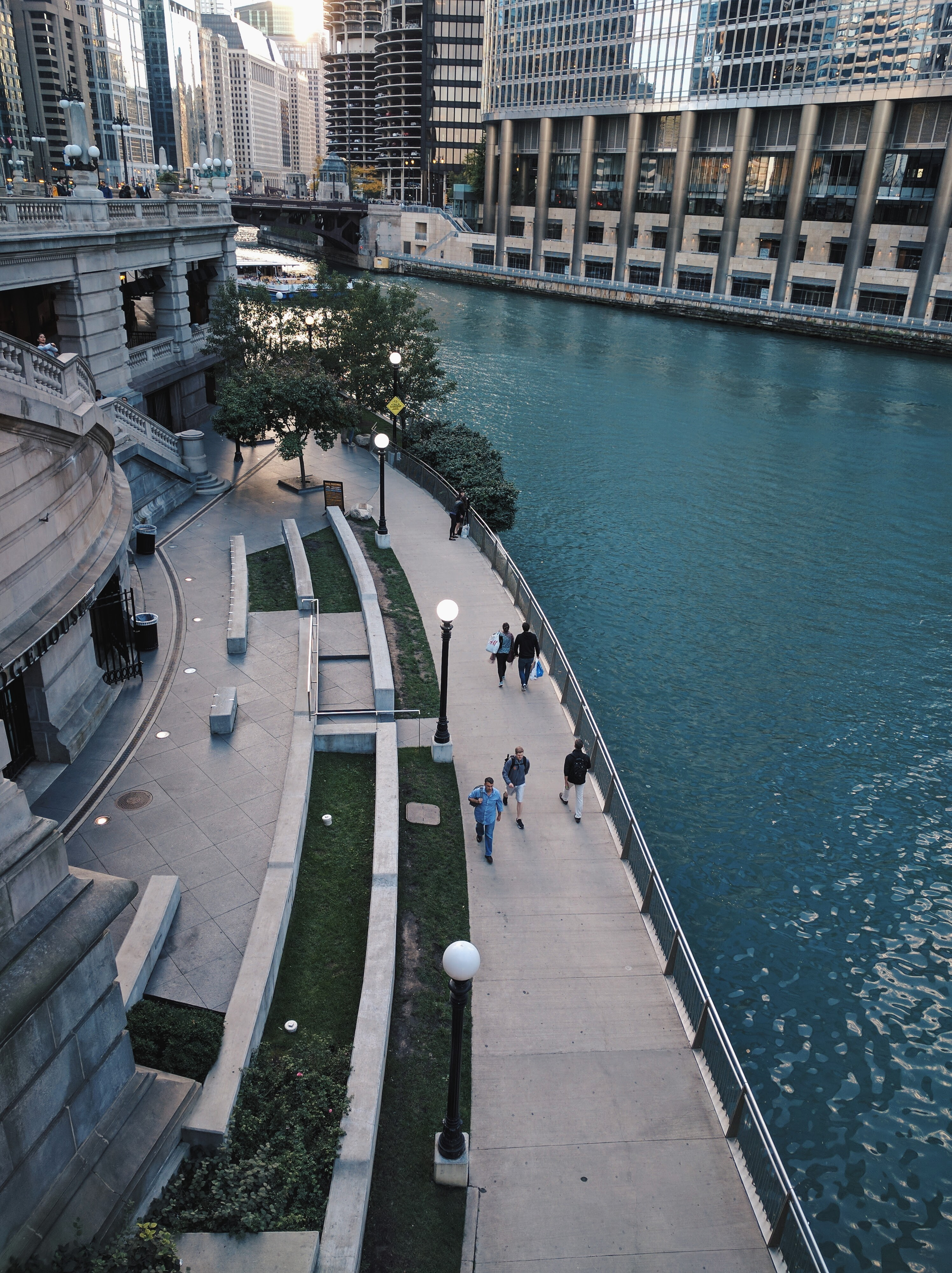
View Chicago Riverwalk from DuSable Bridge 2016

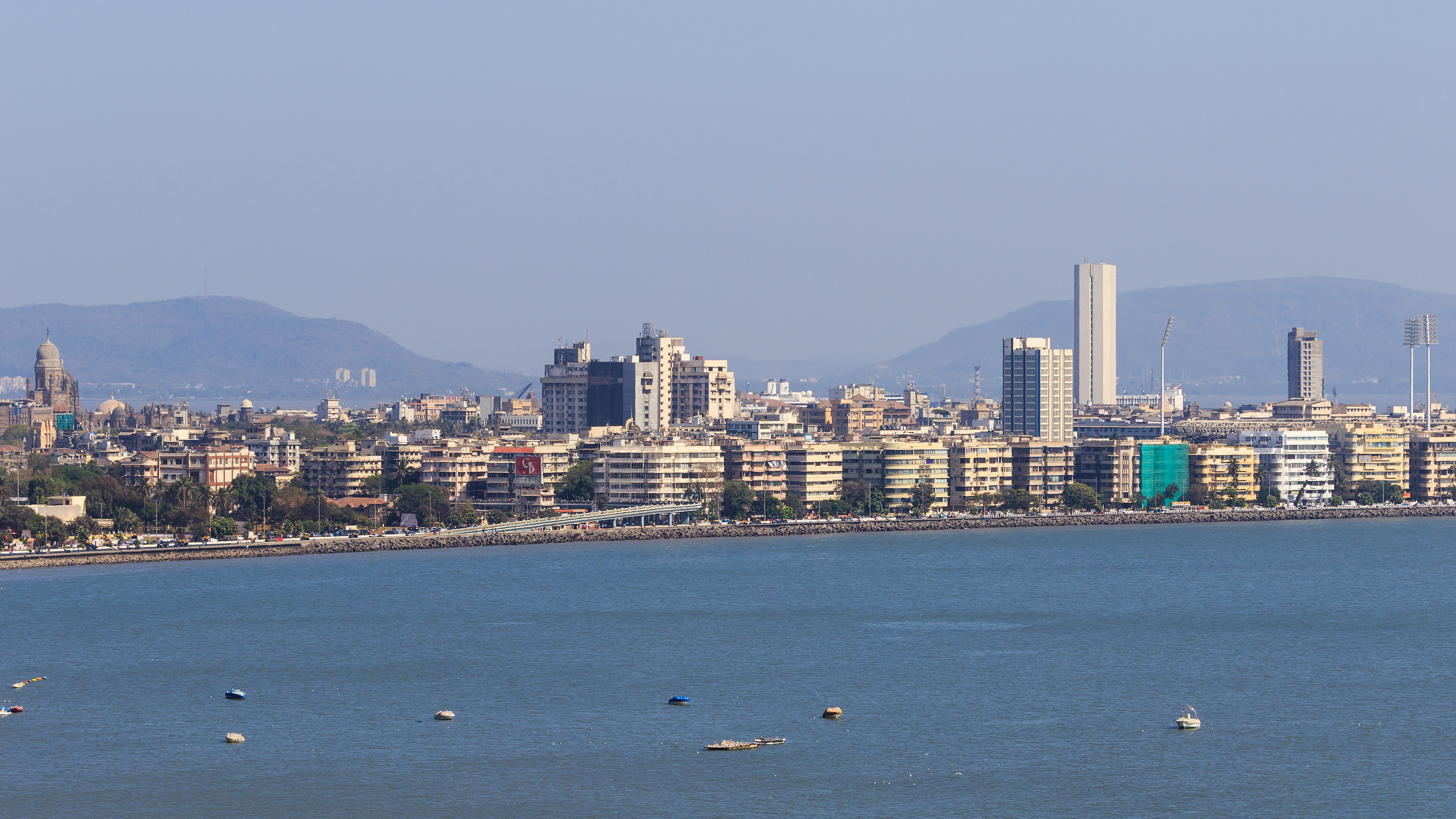
View of Marine Drive, Mumbai from Malabar Hills in Mumbai

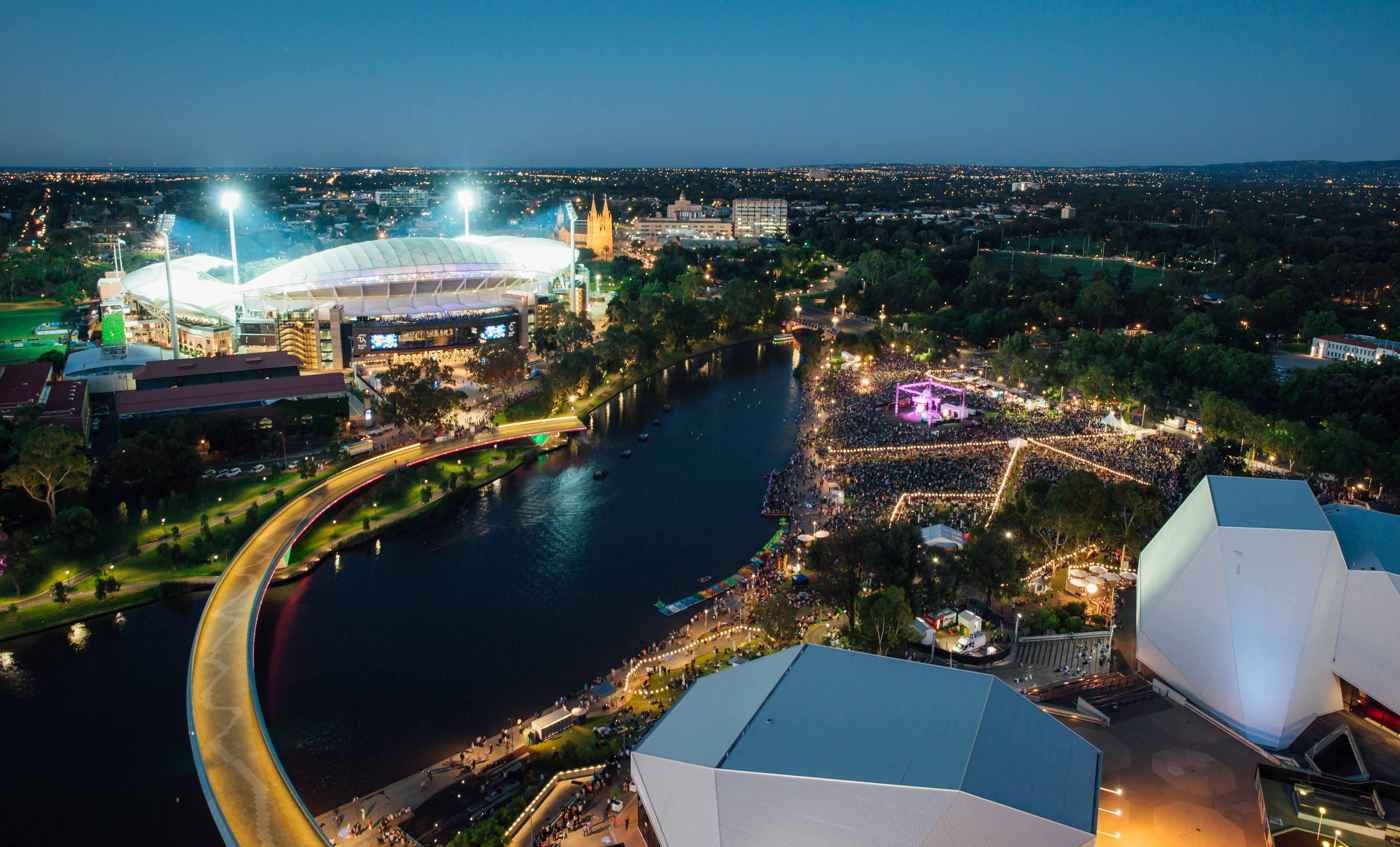
View over the Torrens River in Adelaide, Australia

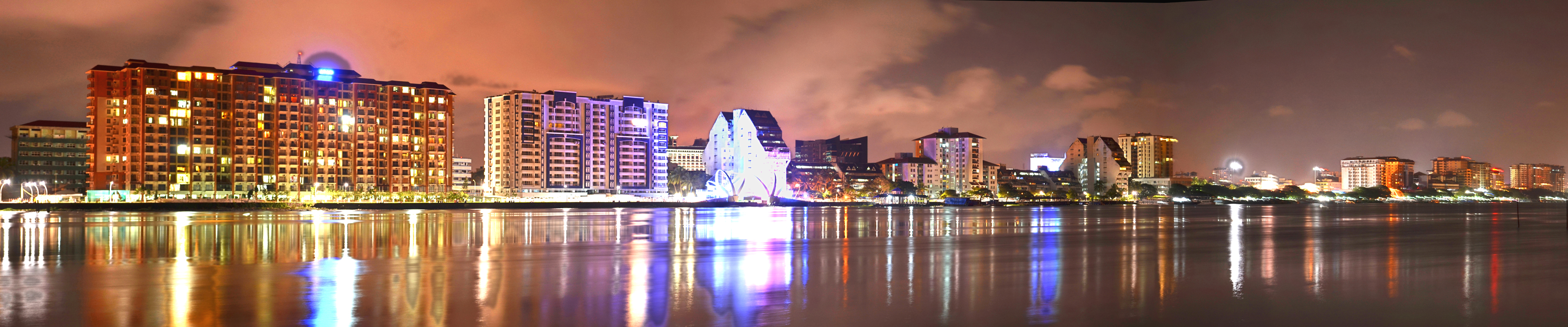
Night view of Marine Drive in Kochi

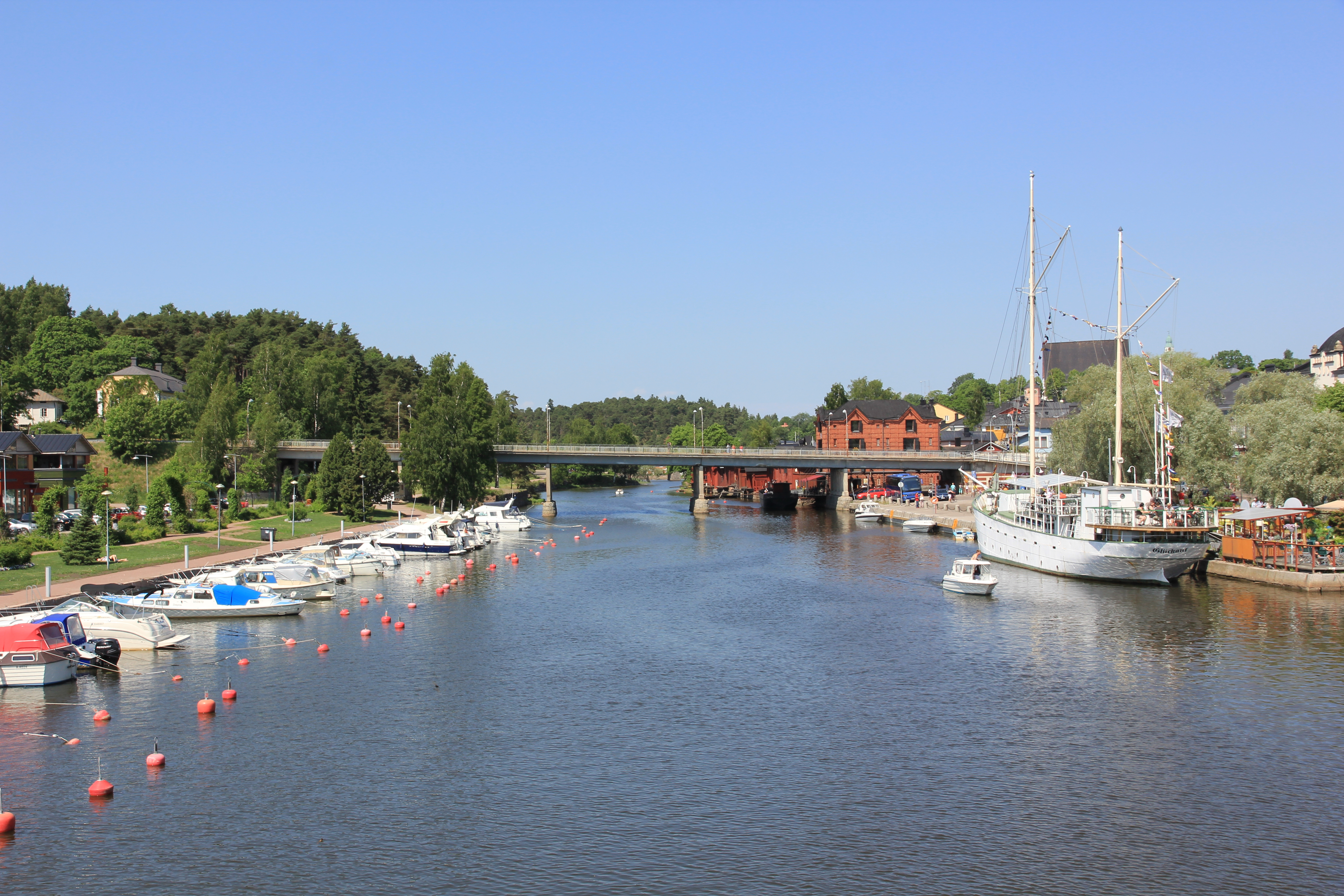
The Porvoo River along the town of Porvoo, Finland

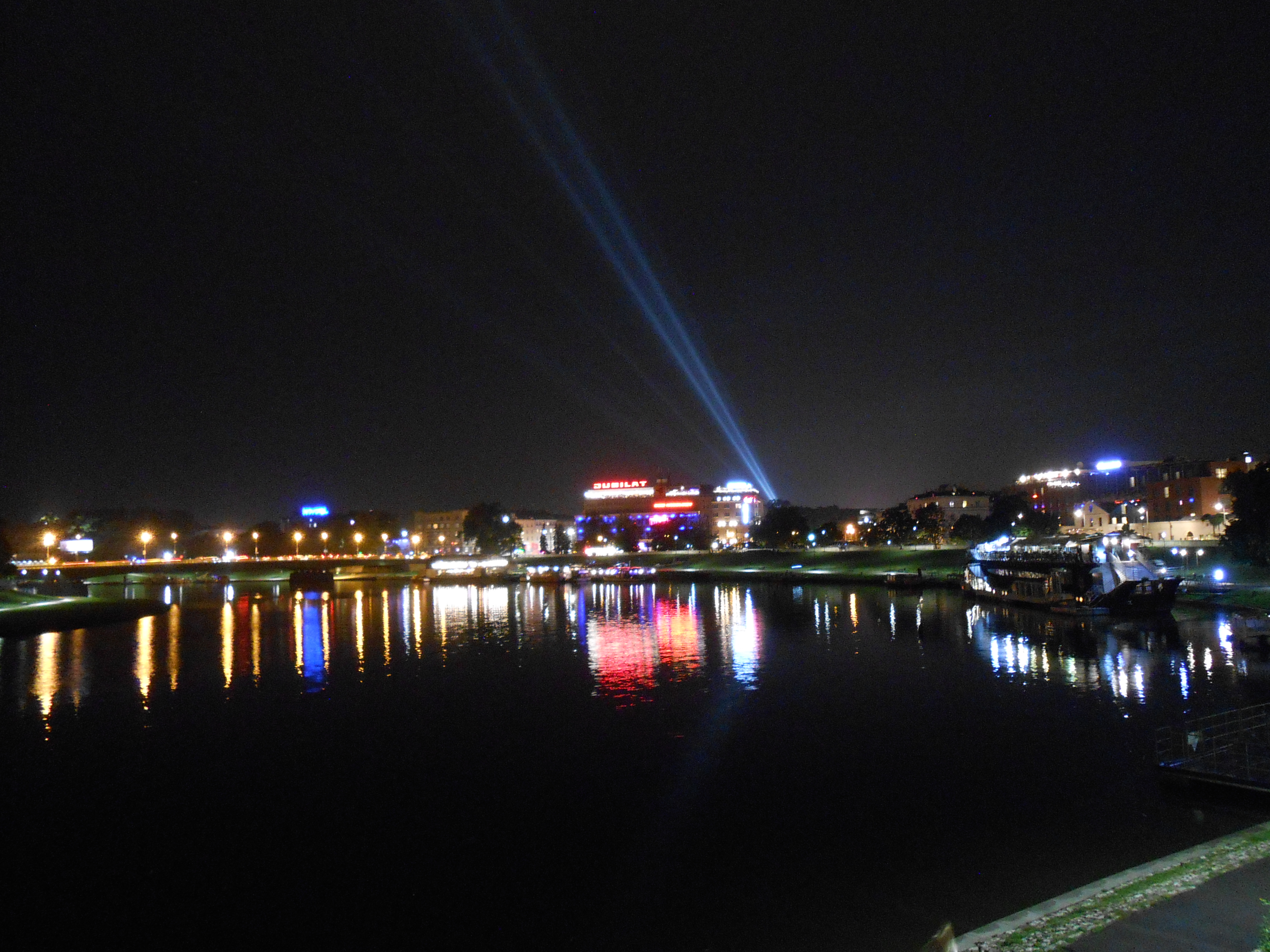
Riverfront in Cracow, Poland

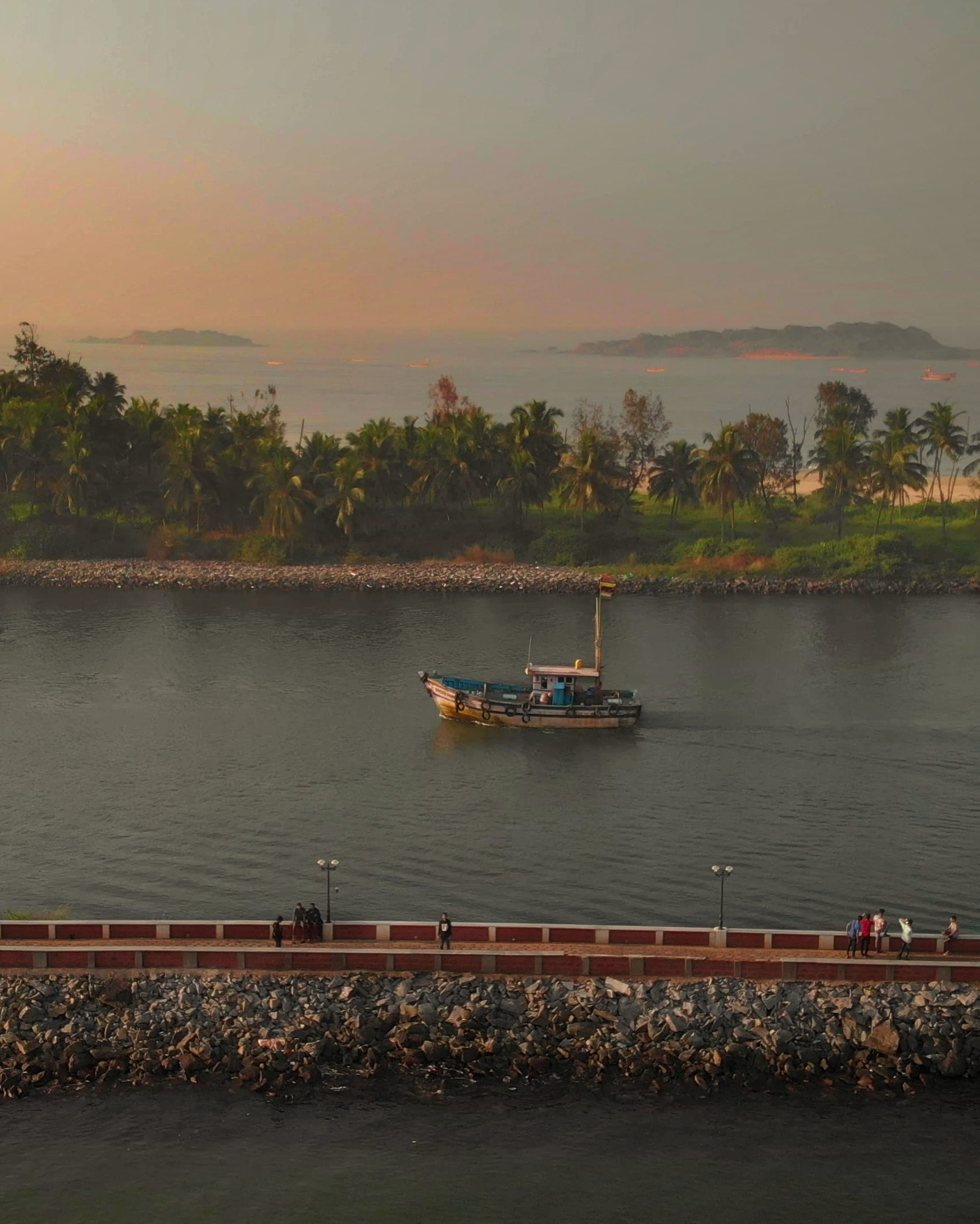
Malpe Sea Walk, Udupi, India

== See also ==
- Boardwalk
- Clearwater Festival
- Esplanade
- Hey Looka Yonder
- Hudson River Sloop Clearwater
- Malecon (disambiguation)
- Riverwalk (disambiguation)
- Corniche
