= Ravi Riverfront Urban Development Project =

Urban development megaproject in Punjab, Pakistan

Ravi Riverfront
- Interactive map of Ravi Riverfront
- Location: Lahore District, Punjab, Pakistan
- Coordinates: 31°37′08″N 74°19′31″E
- Status: Under construction
- Groundbreaking: December 2020
- Use: Riverfront, waterfront
- Website: ruda.gov.pk

Companies
- Architect: Meinhardt Group
- Developer: Ravi Riverfront Development Authority

Technical details
- Cost: ₨5 trillion (US$30.69 billion)
- Size: 41,308 hectares (102,074 acres)
- No. of residents: 15 million (expected)
- Proposed: 1947

The Ravi Riverfront Urban Development Project (RRUDP) is an urban development megaproject in Lahore District, Punjab, Pakistan that runs along the Ravi River in a north-east to south-west direction. It includes the construction of a 41,308-hectare (102,074-acre) planned city and the rehabilitation of the Ravi River into a perennial freshwater body. The project is to be completed in three phases. It is expected to be the largest riverfront of the world when finished.

== History ==
The idea of an urban development on the Ravi riverfront was first suggested in 1947 by the then Deputy Commissioner of Lahore. In 2013, the Government of Punjab began considering the project, which was initially planned to span over 18,000 hectares (44,000 acres). In 2014, Lahore Development Authority hired Singapore-based architectural firm Meinhardt Group to run a feasibility study on the Ravi River for the development of the project.

The project was inaugurated on 7 August 2020 by then Prime Minister Imran Khan, and construction began in December 2020.

After the project was scrapped by the Islamabad High Court, Imran Khan's government in Punjab began working on the project once again in September 2022. As of September 2022, it had attracted US$40 billion in foreign investment.

== Project details ==
The Rs. 5 trillion project aims to rehabilitate and develop the Ravi River into a perennial freshwater body, with high-quality urban development on the adjoining land for up to about 35 million inhabitants. The idea is based on the developments around the River Thames in London. Ravi Urban Development Authority, founded in July 2020, is to oversee the project.

In August 2020, the Provincial Minister of Punjab for housing, urban development and public health engineering Mehmood-ur-Rasheed announced the revised area of the riverfront development to be 40,000 hectares (100,000 acres) instead of 18,000 hectares. 70% of its area will be reserved for the plantation of 6 million trees. A lake, an urban forest, three barrages and six water treatment plants will be built in the first phase. Upper Chenab Canal and BRB canal will be used to provide water to the development, if needed.

The masterplan is to build a modern city on the banks of the Ravi River, bordering Lahore on the north and the west sides, consisting of green belts, piers, and boardwalks, along with 1.4 million residential units.

== Criticism ==
The Ravi Riverfront development has faced criticism that it is leading to "rampant land grabs" which may displace thousands of farmers. There are accusations that the government is expropriating the land for the benefit of commercial developers, at below the fair value, and a Lahore High Court ruling has found "gross irregularities" in the development process. Further there are concerns of the environmental impact of the development.

== See also ==
- Ravi Urban Development Authority
- List of megaprojects
