= Boardwalk =

Wooden footpath to cross wet land

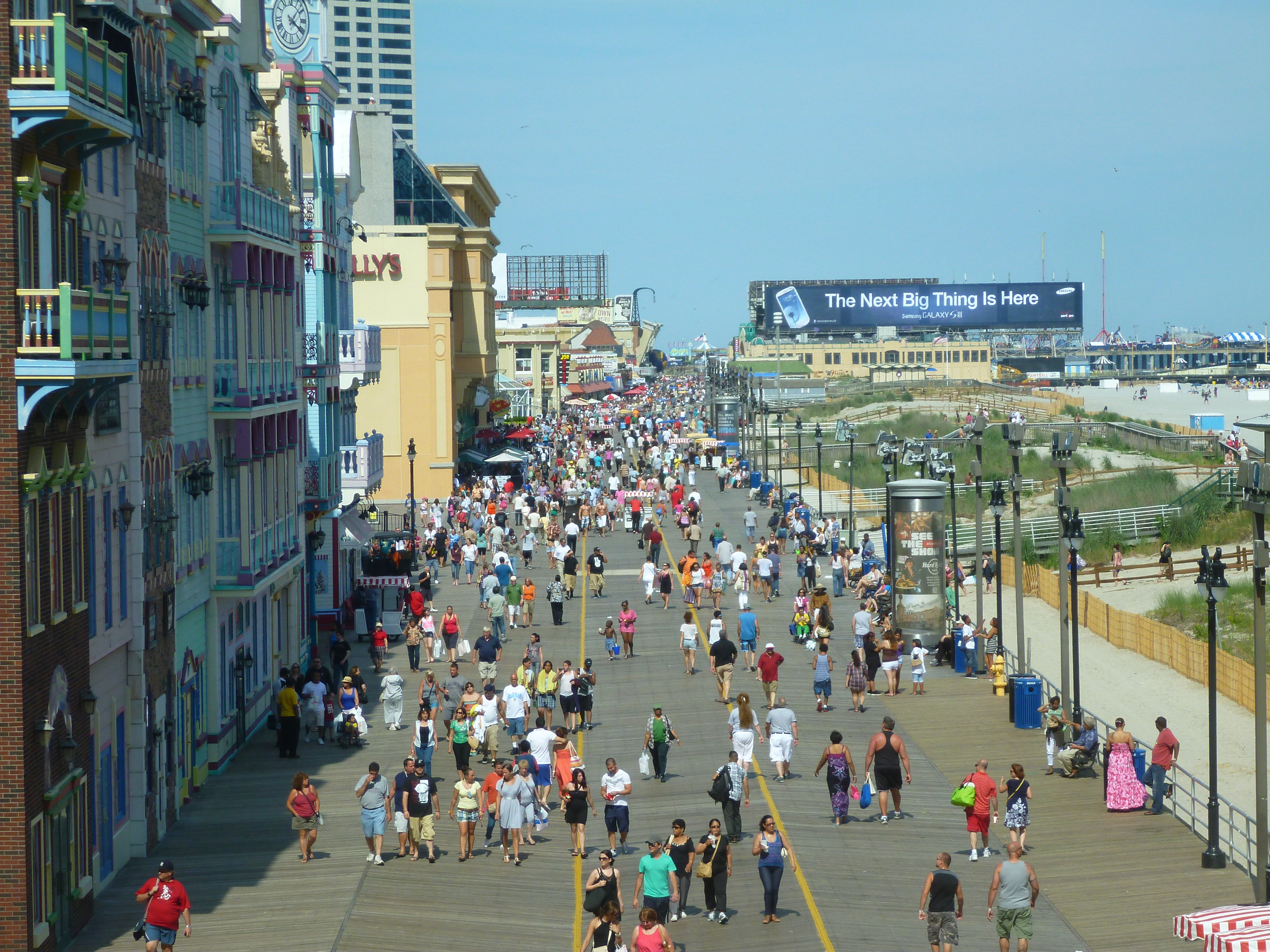
Atlantic City, New Jersey boardwalk, as seen from Caesars Atlantic City, opened in 1870, as the first U.S. boardwalk. At 5 1/2 miles (9 km) long, it is also one of the world's longest, busiest, and oldest boardwalks. New Jersey is home to the world's highest concentration of boardwalks.

A boardwalk (alternatively board walk, boarded path, or promenade) is an elevated footpath, walkway, or causeway typically built with wooden planks, which functions as a type of low water bridge or small viaduct that enables pedestrians to better cross wet, muddy or marshy lands. Such timber trackways have existed since at least Neolithic times.

In many seaside resort locations, boardwalks along the beach provide access to shops, hotels, and tourist attractions. The Jersey Shore in the United States is especially noted for its abundance of boardwalks.

Some wooden boardwalks have had sections replaced by concrete and even "a type of recycled plastic that looks like wood."

== History ==
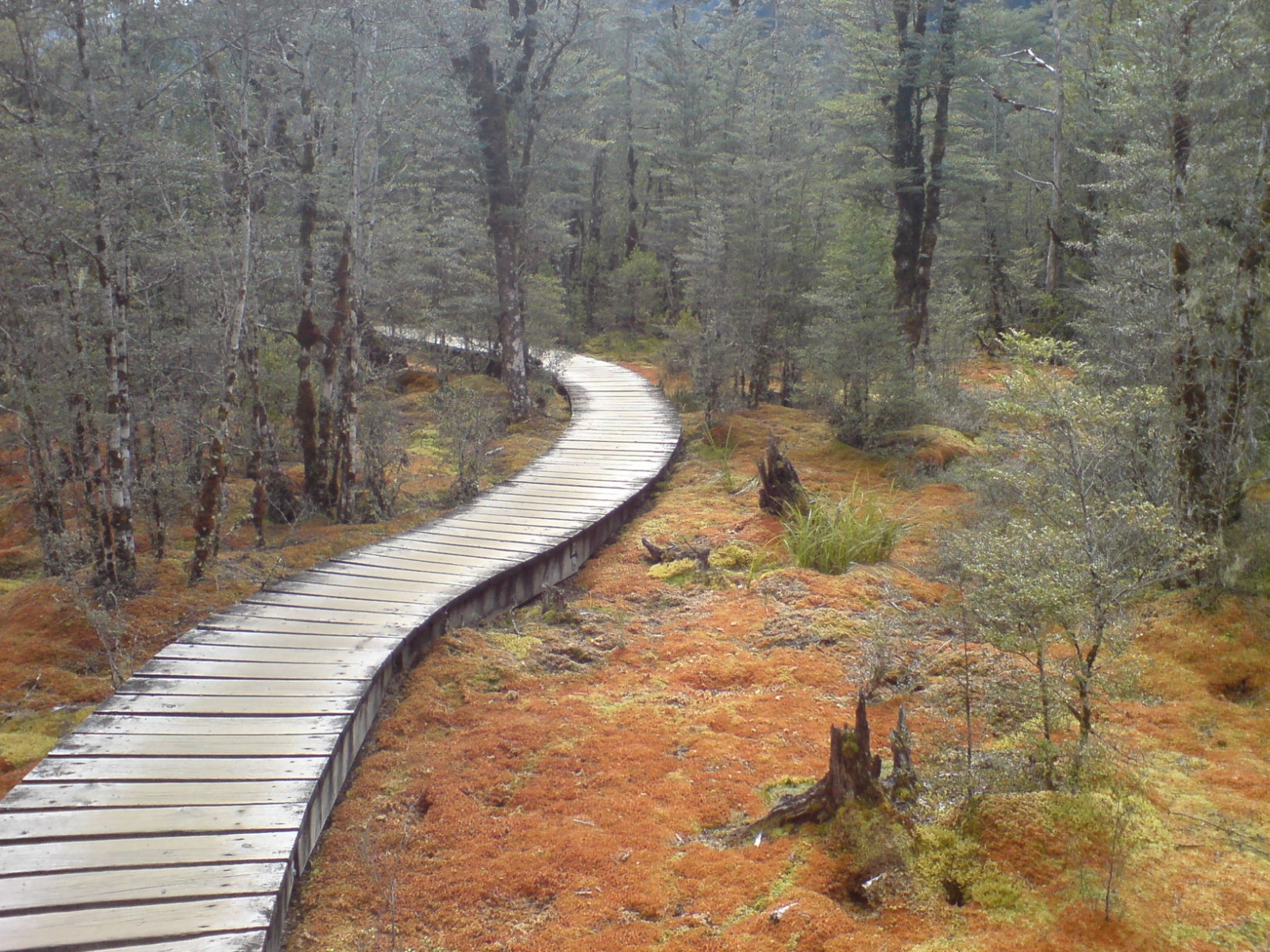
A typical nature boardwalk, carrying walkers over wetlands on the Milford Track, New Zealand

An early example is the Sweet Track that Neolithic people built in the Somerset levels, England, around 6000 years ago. This track consisted mainly of planks of oak laid end-to-end, supported by crossed pegs of ash, oak, and lime, driven into the underlying peat.

The Wittmoor bog trackway is the name given to each of two prehistoric plank roads, or boardwalks, trackway No. I being discovered in 1898 and trackway No. II in 1904 in the Wittmoor bog in northern Hamburg, Germany. The trackways date to the 4th and 7th century AD, both linked the eastern and western shores of the formerly inaccessible, swampy bog. A part of the older trackway No. II dating to the period of the Roman Empire is on display at the permanent exhibition of the Archaeological Museum Hamburg in Harburg borough, Hamburg.

== Duckboards ==
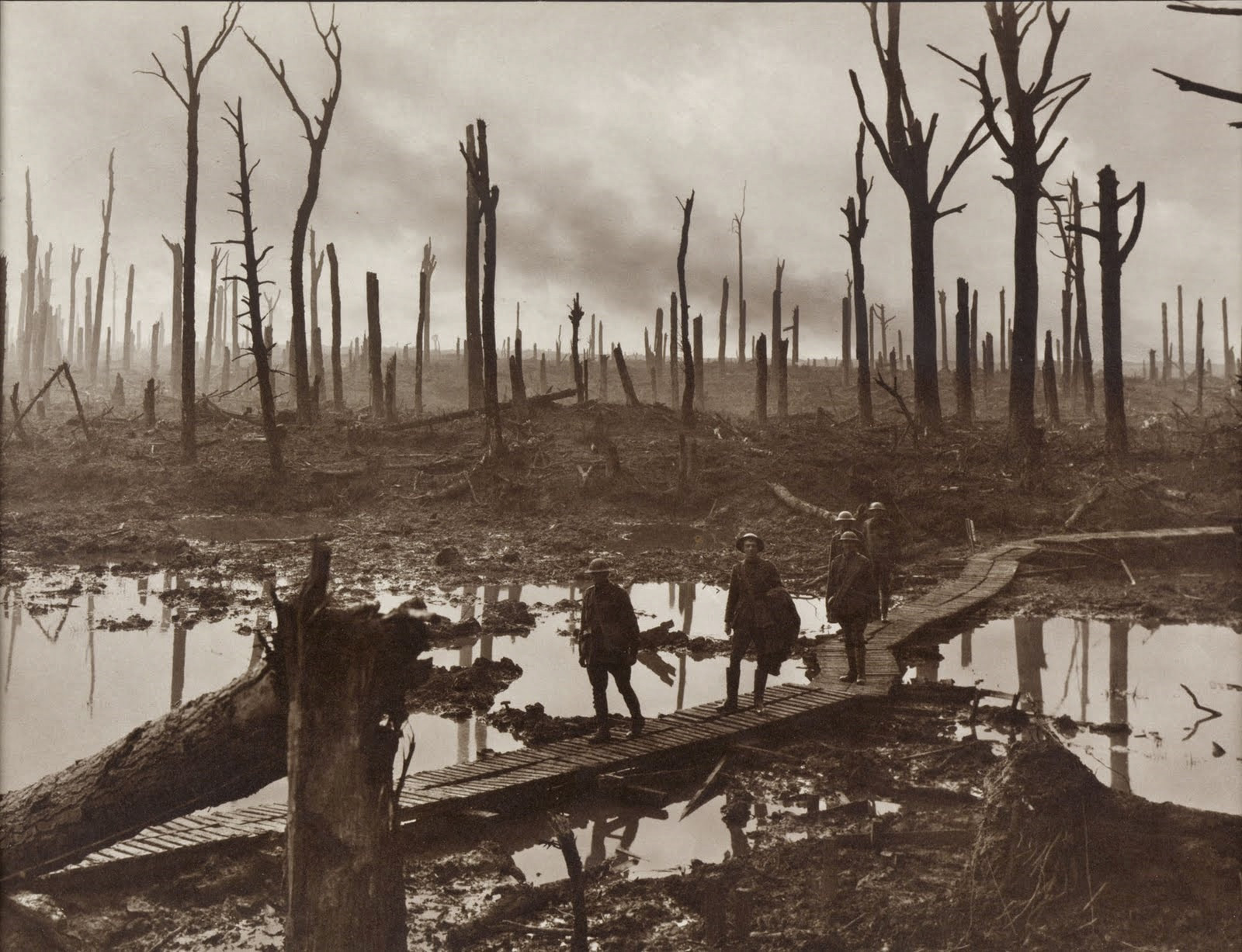
Australian soldiers walking along duckboards during the Battle of Passchendaele

A duckboard is a type of boardwalk placed over muddy and wet ground. During World War I, duckboards were used to line the bottom of trenches on the Western Front because these were regularly flooded, and mud and water would lie in the trenches for months on end. The boards helped to keep the soldiers' feet dry and prevent the development of trench foot, caused by prolonged standing in waterlogged conditions. They also allowed for troops' easier movement through the trench systems.

Combat troops on nearly all sides routinely wore hobnail-style trench boots that often slipped on the new duck boards when they were wet, and required extra caution. Falling or slipping off the duckboards could often be dangerous, even fatal. Unfortunate soldiers were left struggling to rise under the weight of their equipment in the intractable and sometimes deep water or mud. If this happened at ground level during a tactical advance, the rising soldier could be left a defenseless target for enemy fire as well as hinder forward progress. He could also simply go unnoticed in the ensuing melee, and easily drown under his heavy equipment.

== Gallery ==
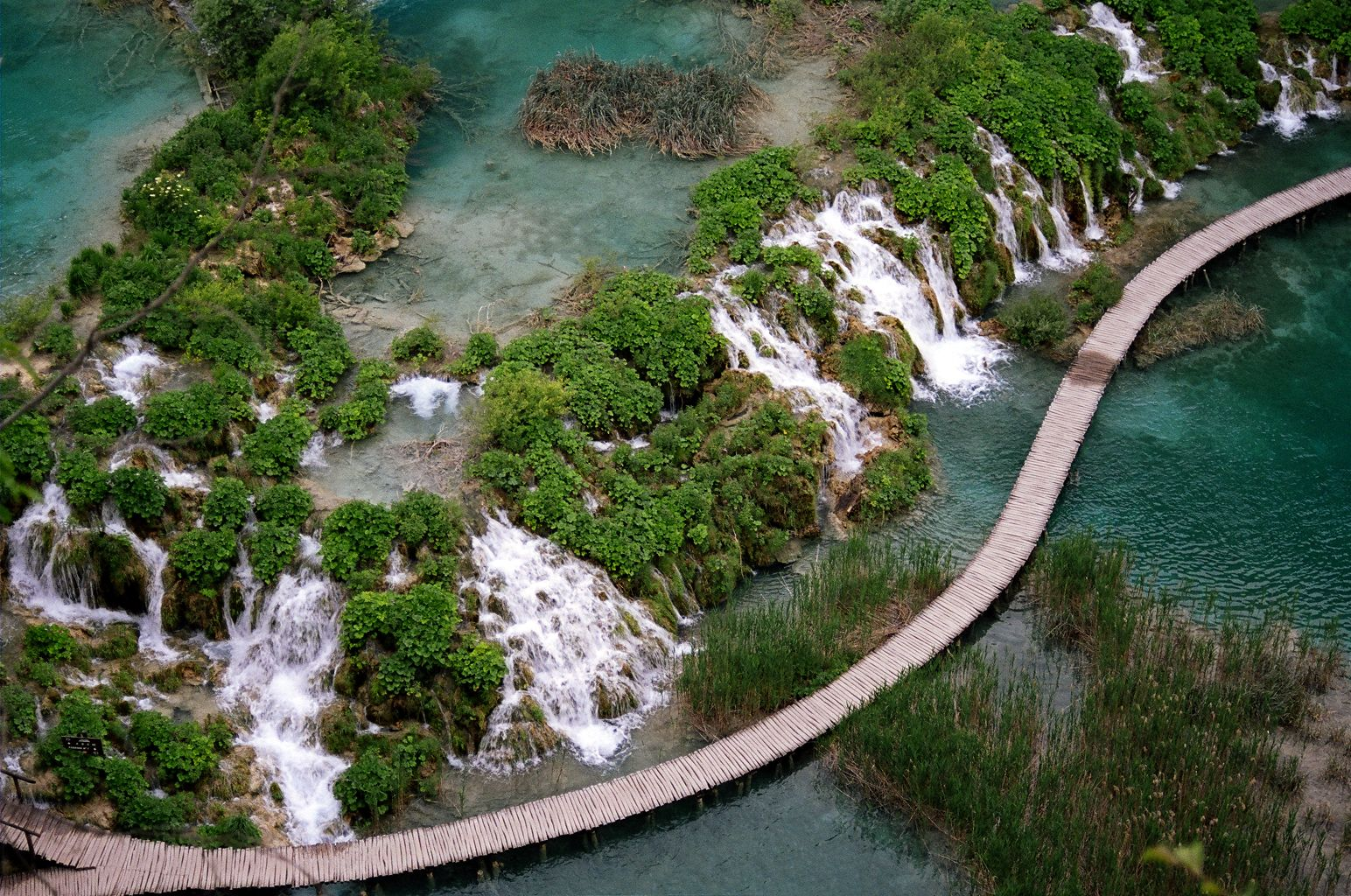
A wooden boardwalk allows passage through a lake, such as this one in Plitvice Lakes National Park, Croatia.

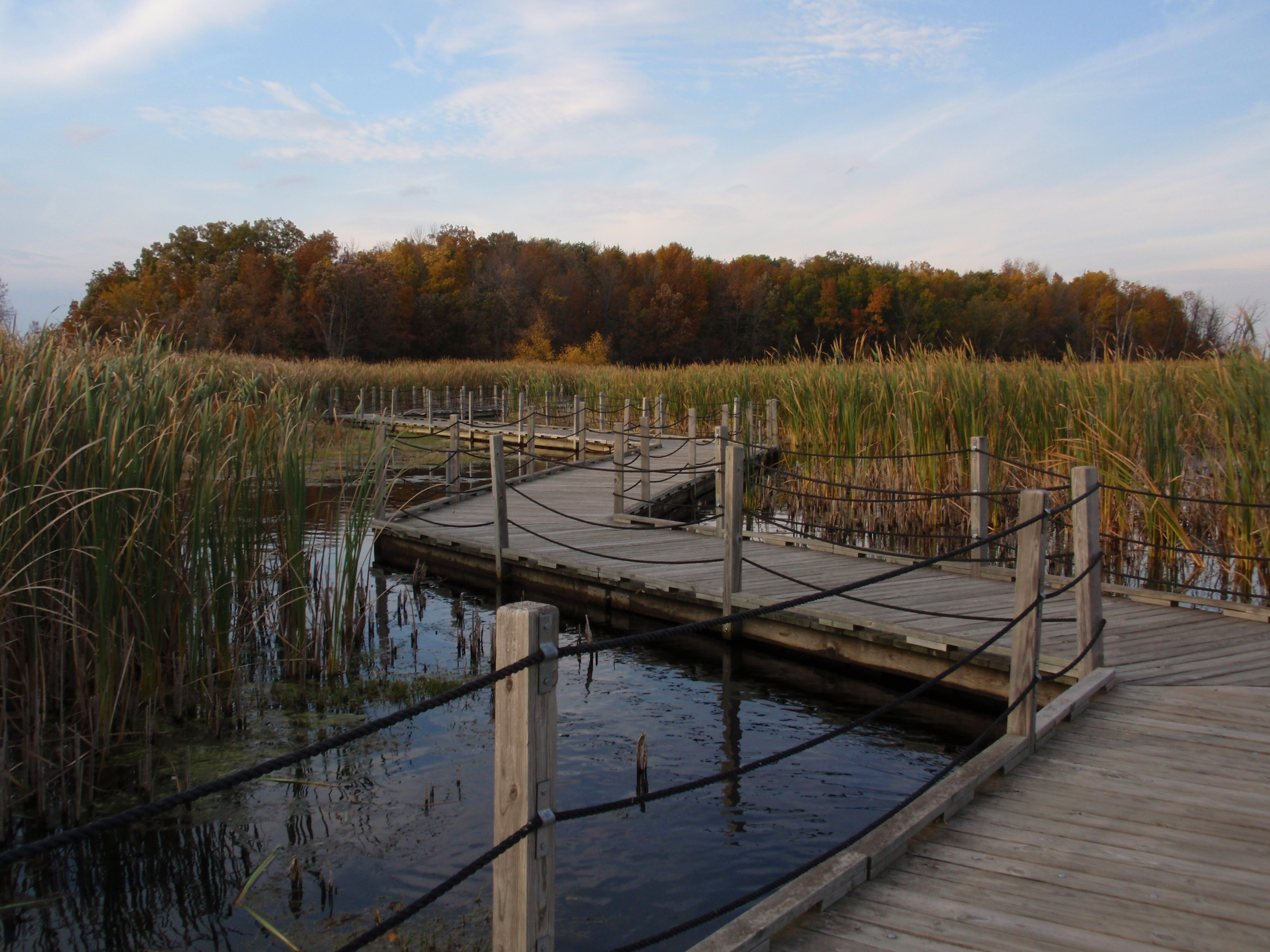
This boardwalk allows people to cross Horicon Marsh.

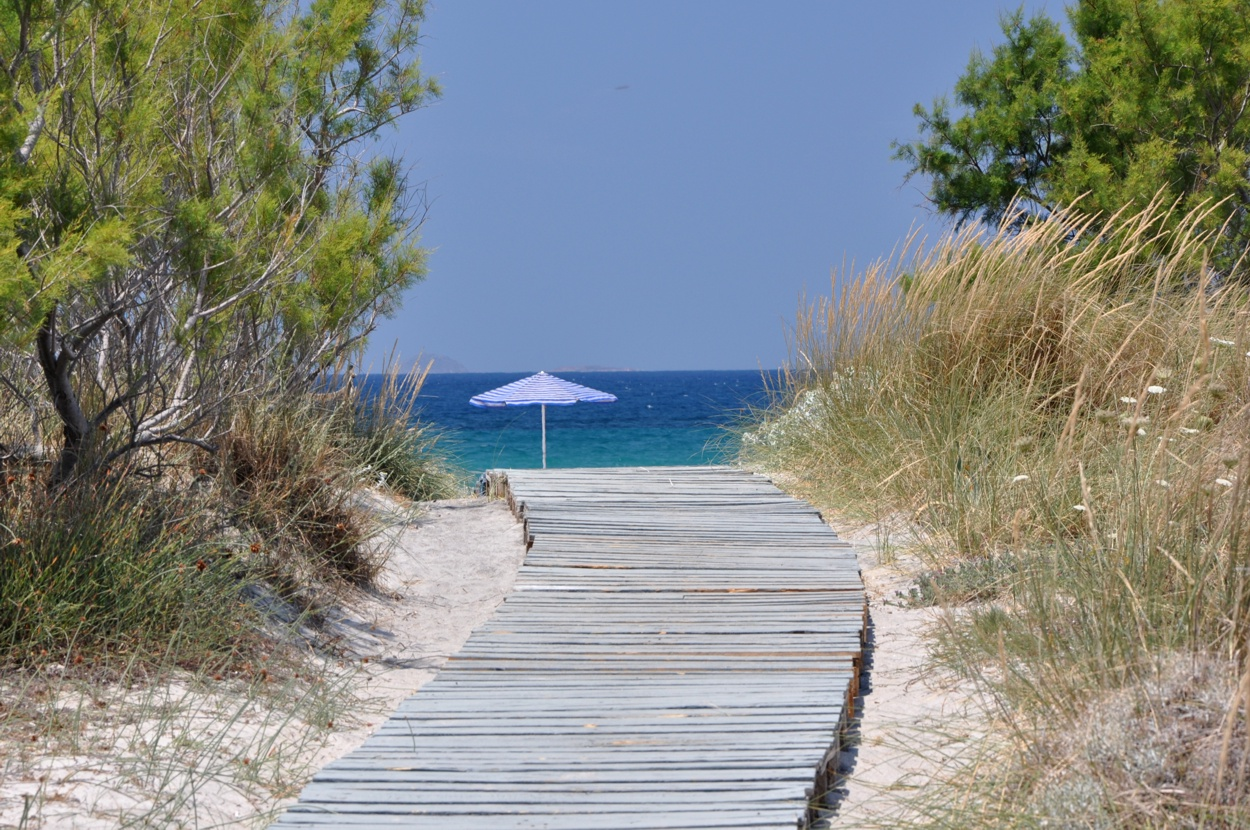
Boardwalk to the Lambi Beach on the Greek island of Kos

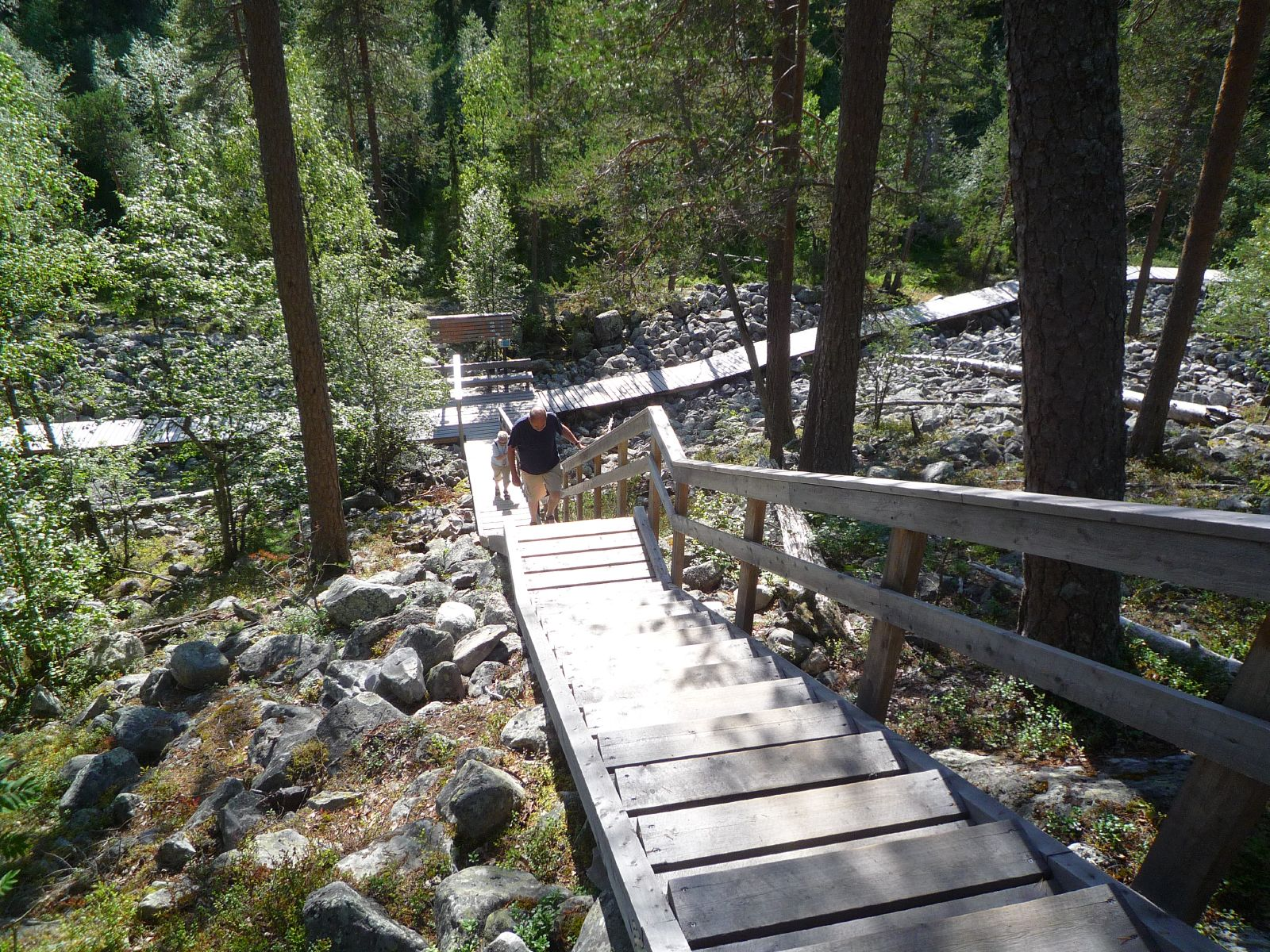
Boardwalks help walkers navigate difficult terrain as at Pyhä-Luosto National Park in Lapland, Finland.

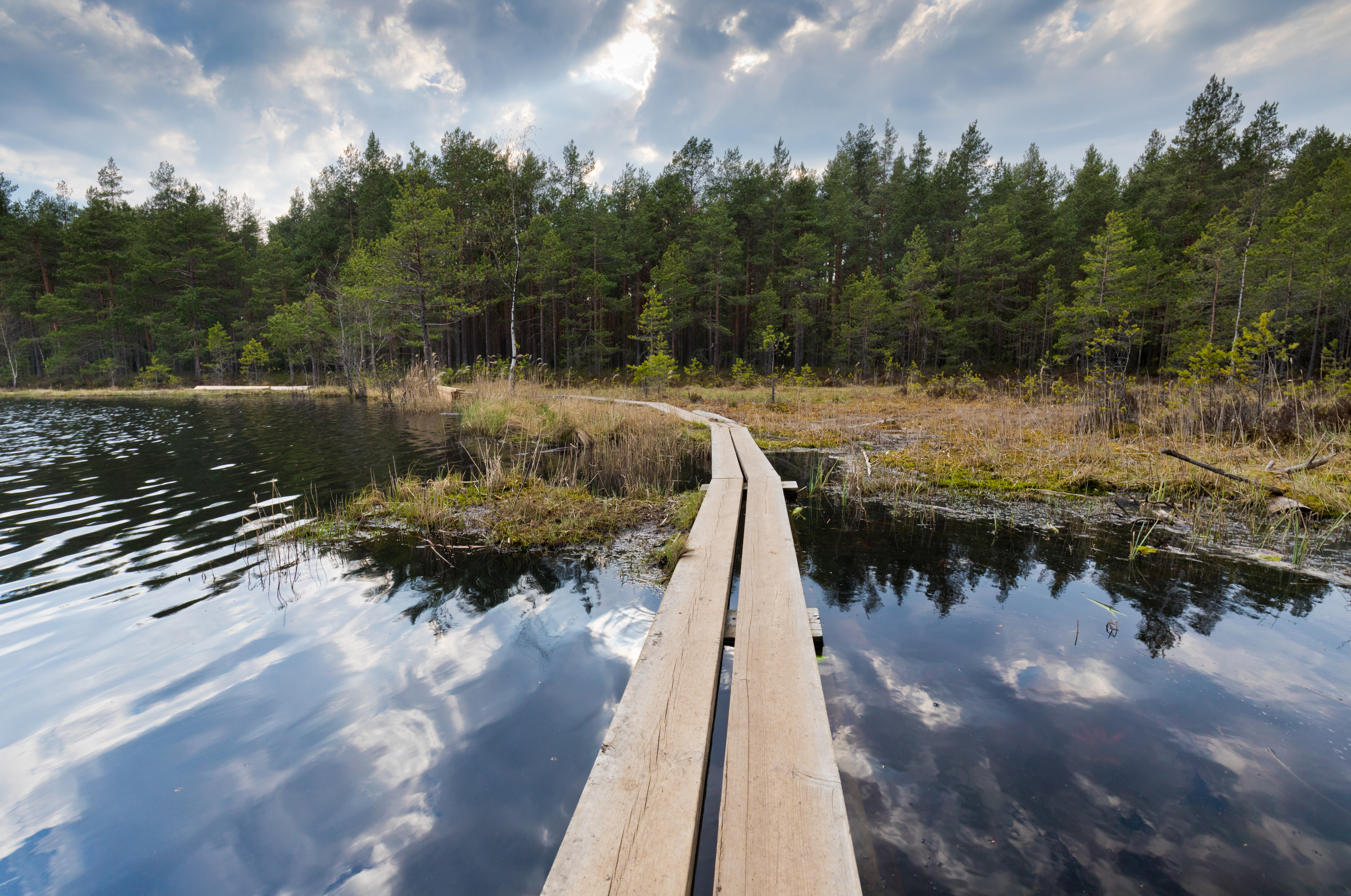
Duckboards on the Lake Storträsk at Sipoonkorpi National Park in Uusimaa, Finland

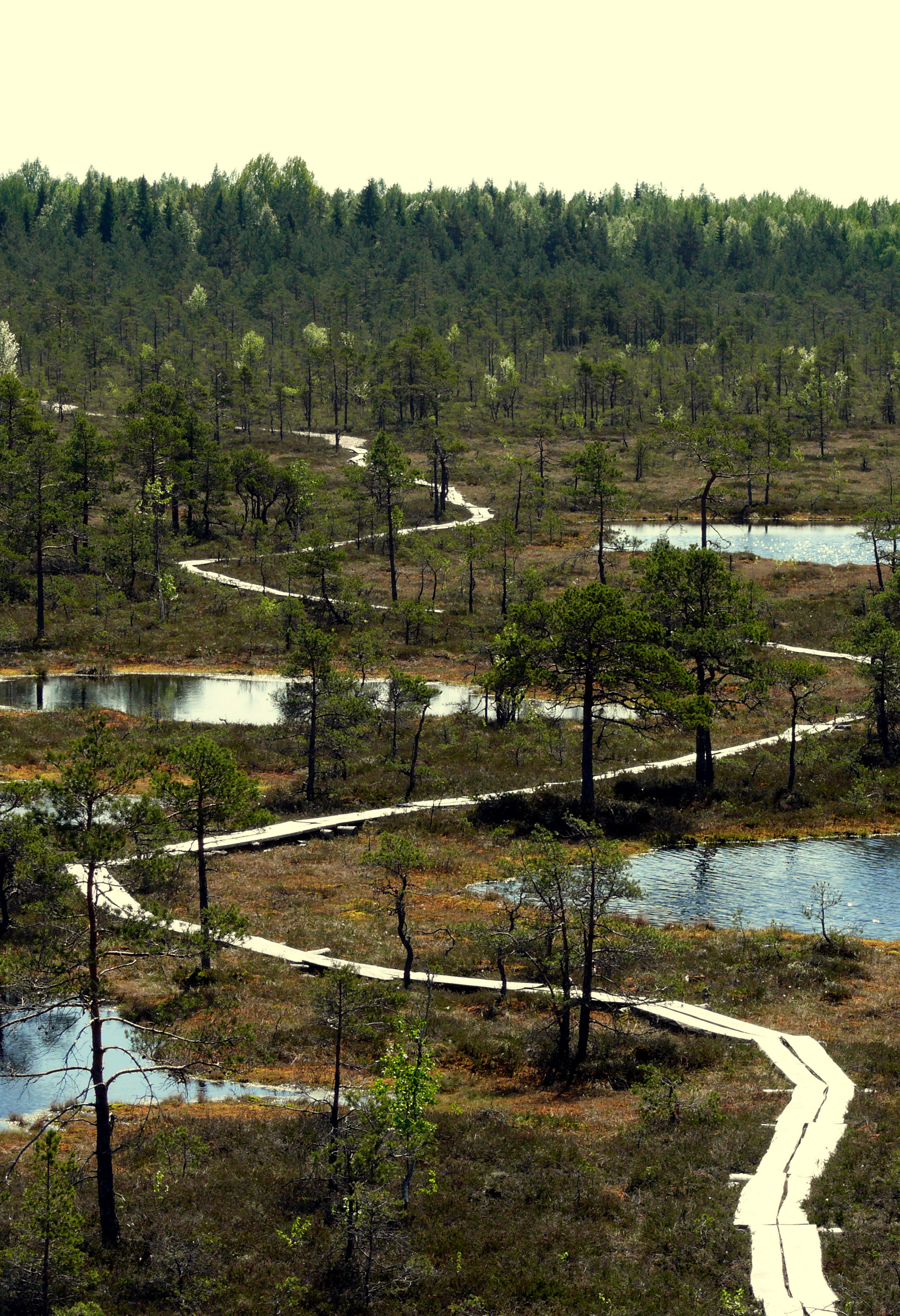
A duckboard enables those on foot to cross a bog in Estonia.

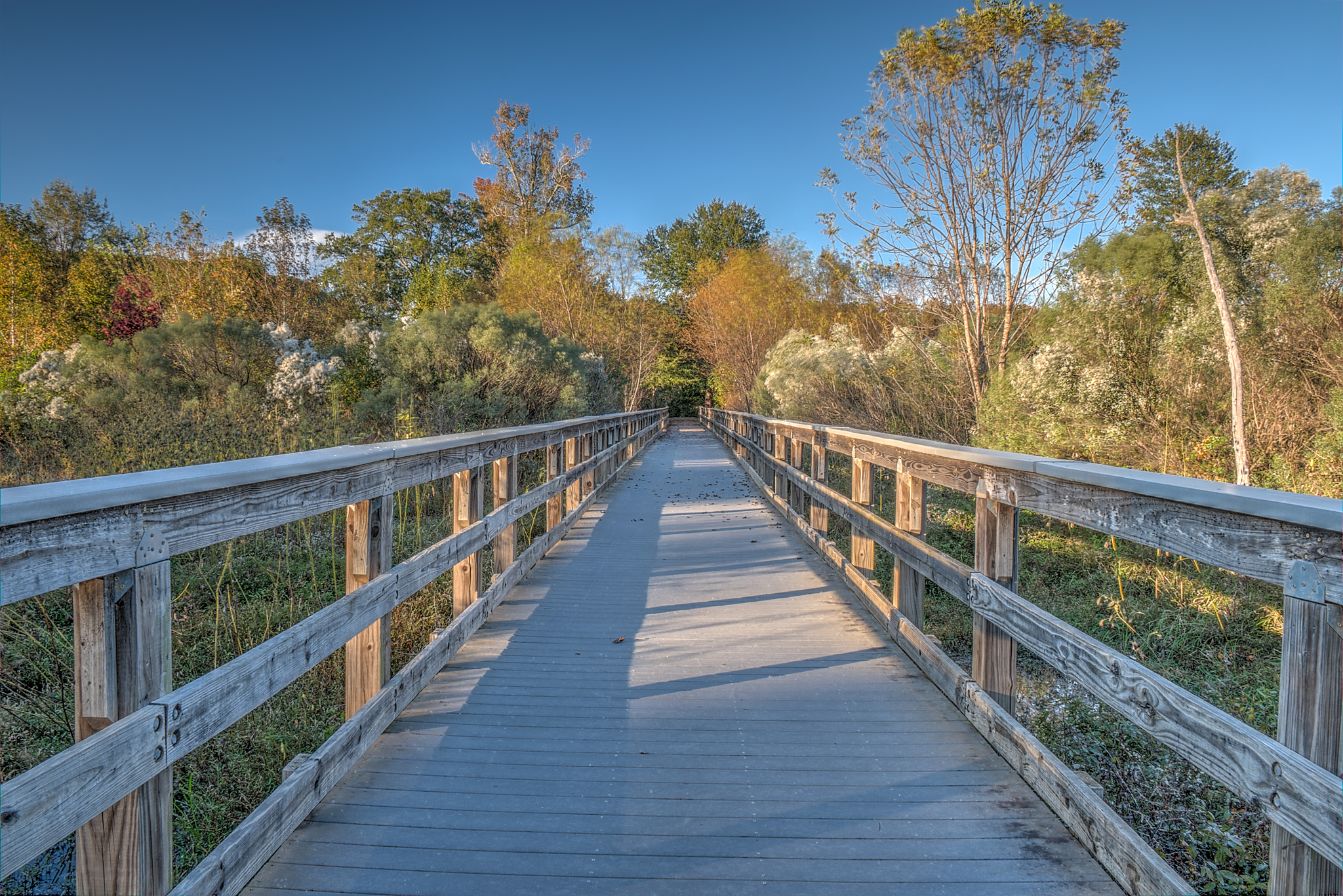
Boardwalk at Ocmulgee National Monument

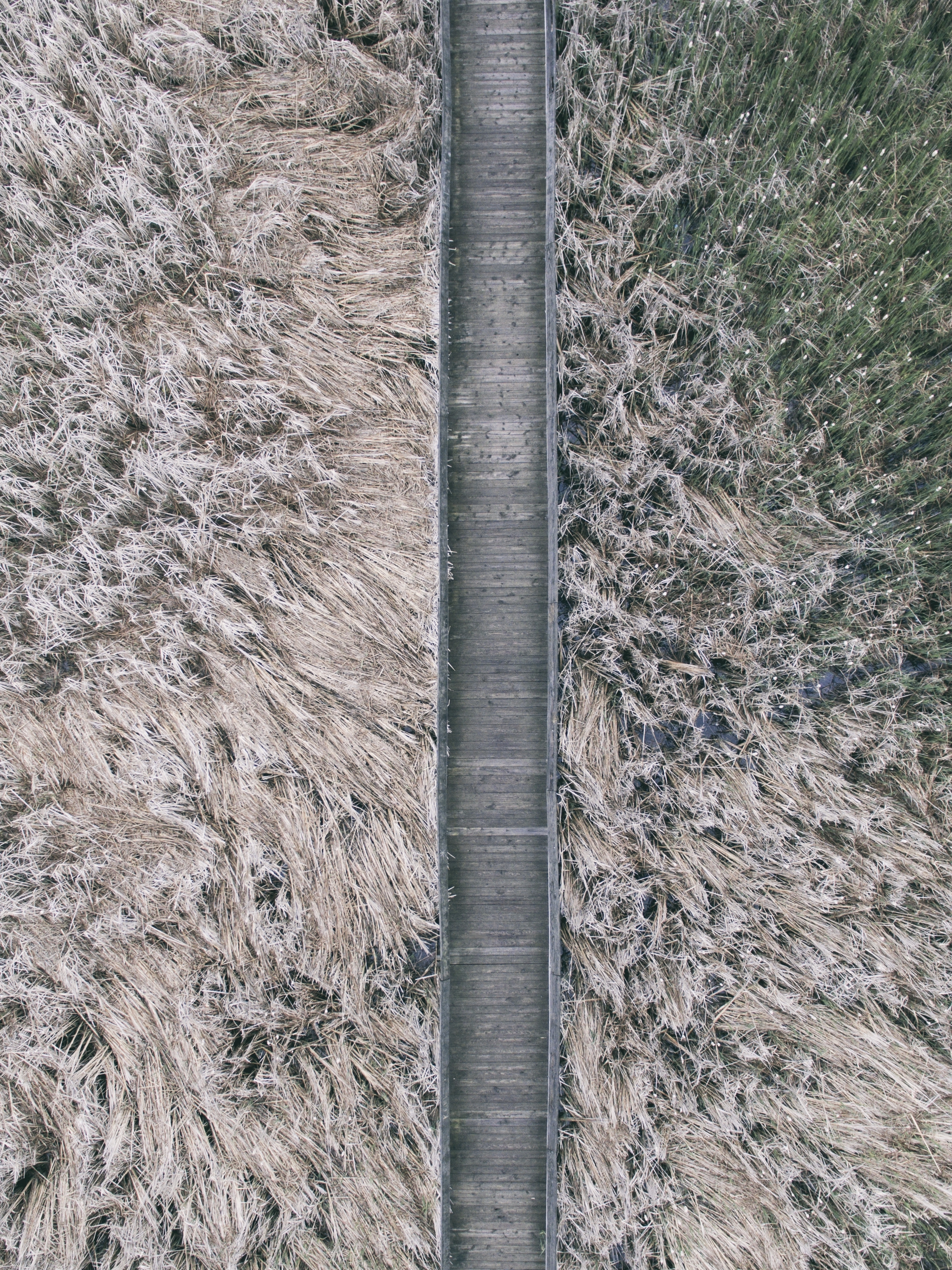
Boardwalk surrounded by tall grass

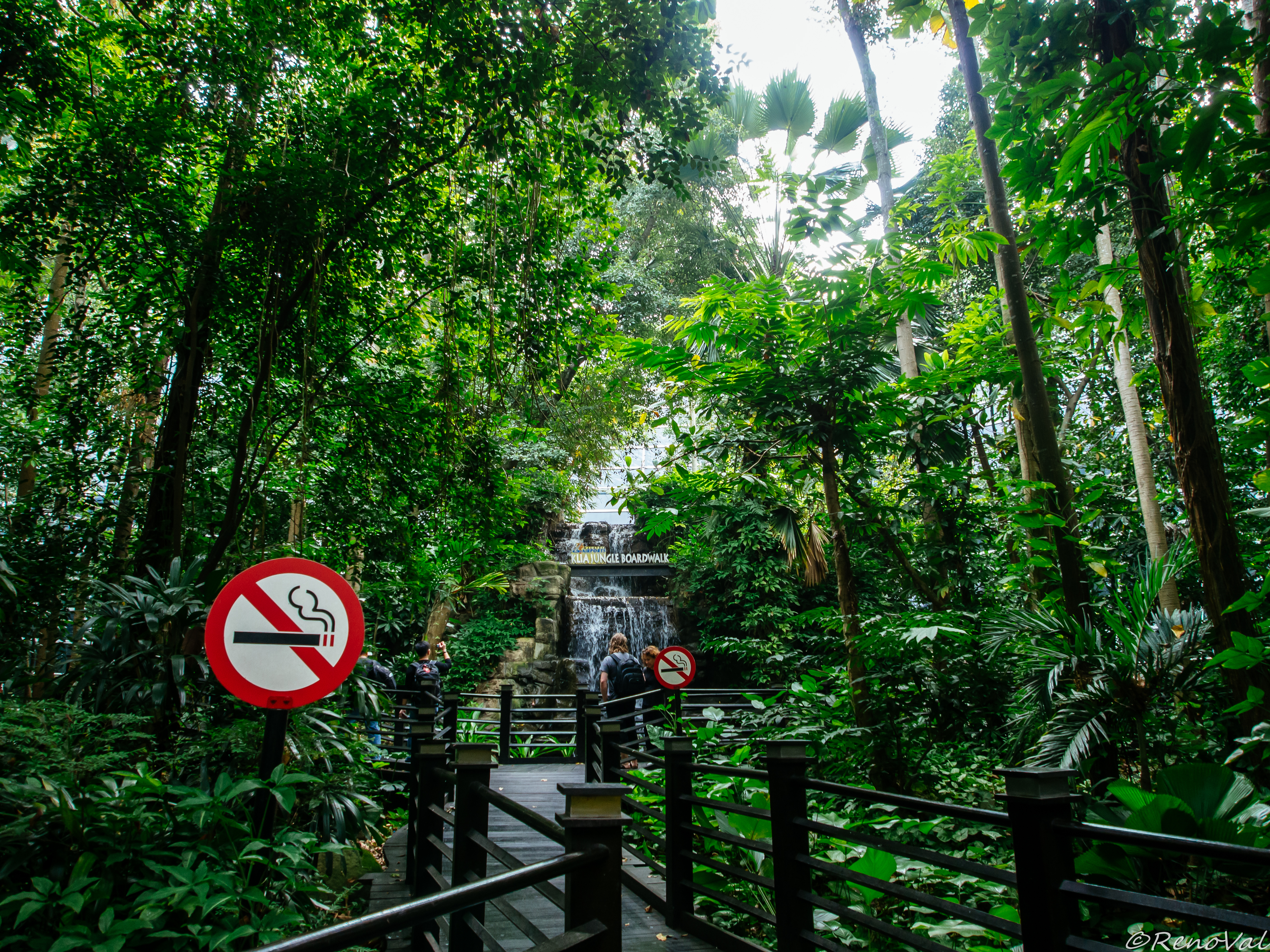
KLIA Airport Boardwalk

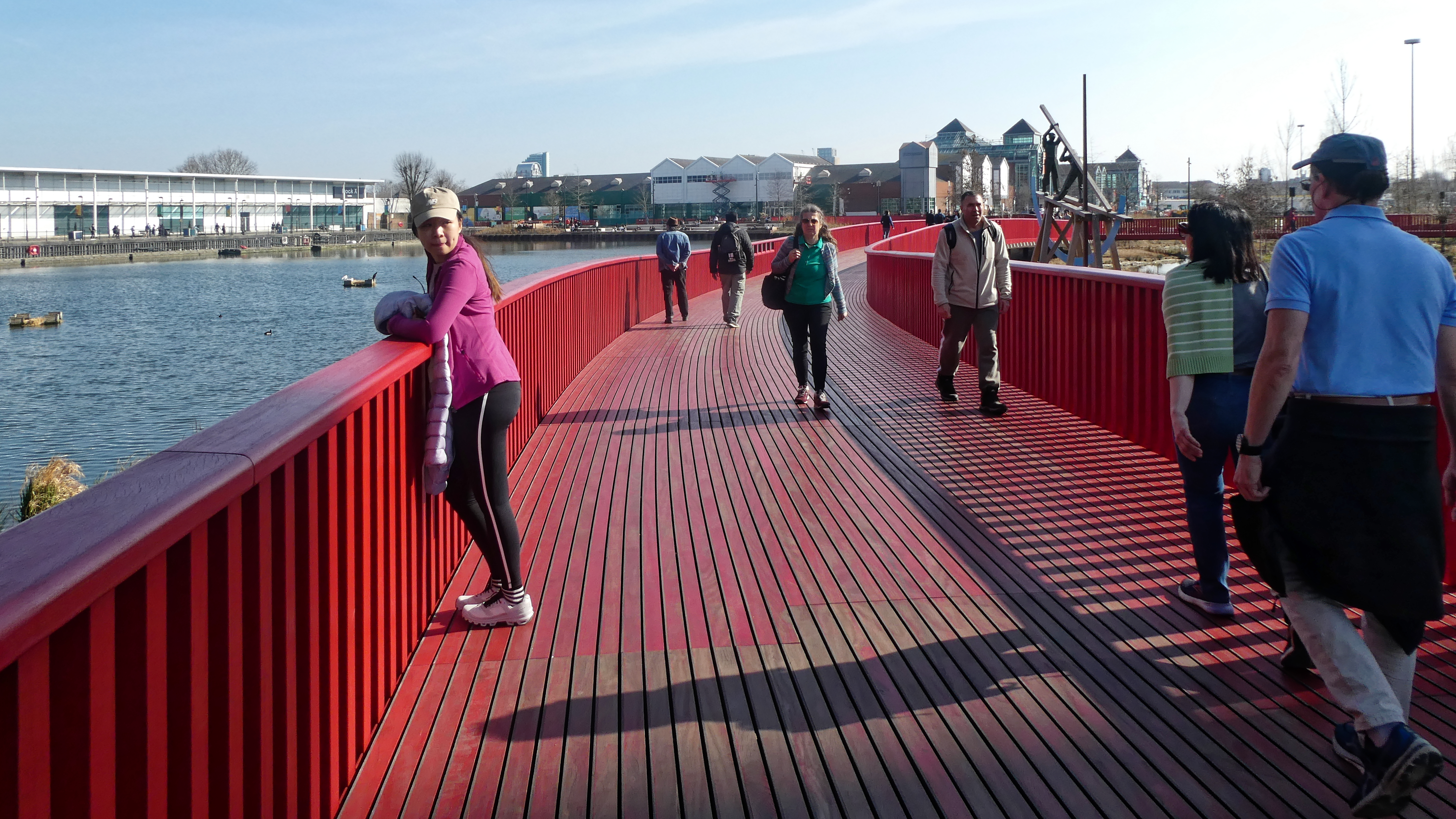
Canada Dock Boardwalk, an urban boardwalk in Canada Water, London

== See also ==
- Corduroy road
- List of boardwalks in the United States
- Footbridge
- Marston Mat, a 20th-century equivalent for airport runways
- Nature trail
- Plank road
- Riverfront
- Riverwalk (disambiguation)
- Sweet Track and Post Track
- Timber trackway
- "Under the Boardwalk", 1964 pop song
