= Blue Water River Walk =

Pedestrian walkway

Coordinates: 42.9699°N 82.4205°W

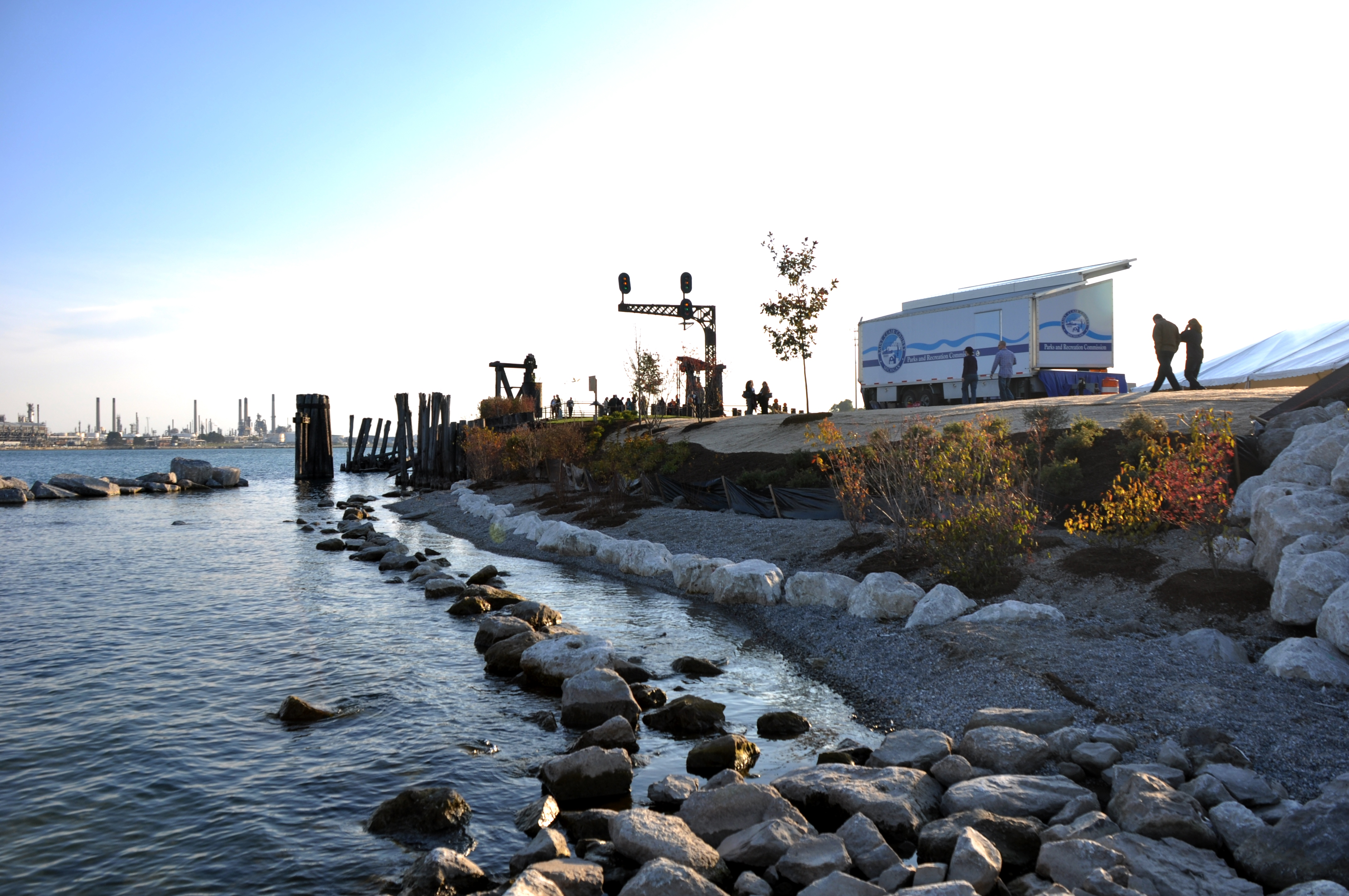
Looking south along the shoreline

The Blue Water River Walk is a nearly one mile stretch of land along the St. Clair River in Port Huron, Michigan. The River Walk begins just south of the mouth of the Black River and continues to the Seaway Terminal. It is less than a mile south of the Blue Water Bridge to Sarnia and the southern end of Lake Huron. The Blue Water River Walk includes a naturalized shoreline made up of natural rocks, boulders and pebbles. Native plants, flowers, trees and shrubs growing in a natural landscape make up the habitat onshore. The River Walk provides a place for natural habitat to thrive and for visitors to take a walk along the shoreline and enjoy looking for turtles, having a picnic, and watching freighters.

== History ==
The Blue Water River Walk is owned privately by the Community Foundation of St. Clair County through one of its subsidiary companies, the Blue Water Land Fund.

The entire stretch of shoreline was given to the Community Foundation by local philanthropists James and Suzanne Acheson in 2011. In return for the gift, the Foundation promised to find the funding necessary to finish the restoration and rehabilitation of the shoreline, and promised to make it available to the public forever. In essence, the Foundation has turned the shoreline into a "public" park. The shoreline encompasses more than 70 acres of what is now prime waterfront property. The property, known as Desmond Landing, hosts the maritime center, a farmers' market in the summer, fireworks displays and other events. The Blue Water River Walk features offshore reefs, new wildlife habitat, a restored ferry dock and a pedestrian trail. St. Clair County Parks will be developing a wetlands area at the south end of the trail, and the City of Port Huron has expanded the Bridge to Bay Trail to connect with the Blue Water River Walk Trail. In Fall of 2012, the Community Foundation, the Blue Water Land Fund and other federal, state and local officials held a ground–breaking ceremony at the site of the Blue Water River Walk. Senator Debbie Stabenow and Congresswoman Candice Miller addressed the crowd and expressed their support of the project. An official grand opening of the River Walk was held on June 7, 2014.

The Community Foundation of St. Clair County was originally created in 1944. Today it is the largest grant–making foundation in Michigan's Thumb Region and serves to help donors manage their charitable and philanthropic giving.

== Features ==
=== Offshore reefs ===
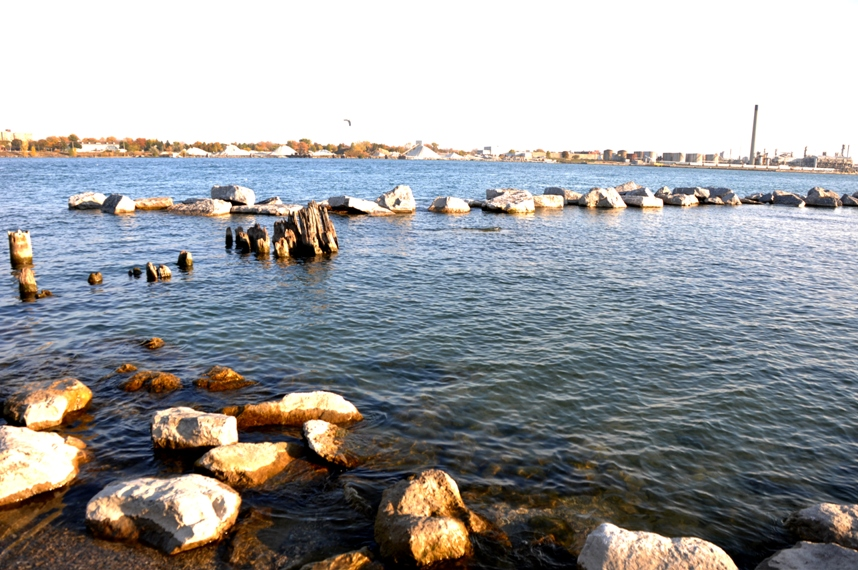
Some of the offshore reefs

Perhaps the most striking different aspect of the new St. Clair River shoreline along the Blue Water River Walk is the huge stone and boulder structures sticking up from the water just offshore. These huge offshore reefs extend down almost 15 feet into the river bottom. The large boulders seen on the surface weigh as much as 4,000 pounds. They are resting on two other layers; recycled slabs of cement on the very bottom and a middle layer of smaller boulders. All together, over 8,000 tons of rock, stone, cement and boulders were used to build these reefs.

These offshore reefs are a critical element to the overall naturalization of the St. Clair River shoreline. Their purpose is twofold: first, they will help knock down the incredibly strong wave energy caused by passing boats. Left unchecked, those waves would cause serious damage to the new plants and habitat along the shoreline. Secondly, they create new shallow water habitat between the reefs and the shoreline. This habitat is critical to the growth and development of small fish, reptiles and amphibians. Much of the upper St. Clair River is lacking in shallow water habitat for fish and wildlife. These reefs have helped create new shallow water habitat along almost one mile of shoreline.

=== Habitats ===
A number of different natural features have been added to the shoreline: these include new plant habitat, basking logs for turtles, snake dens, and bird houses. As of summer 2015, visitors can experience a natural wetlands park along the southern part of the river walk. This large component is led and owned by St. Clair County Parks & Recreation.

=== Ferry dock ===
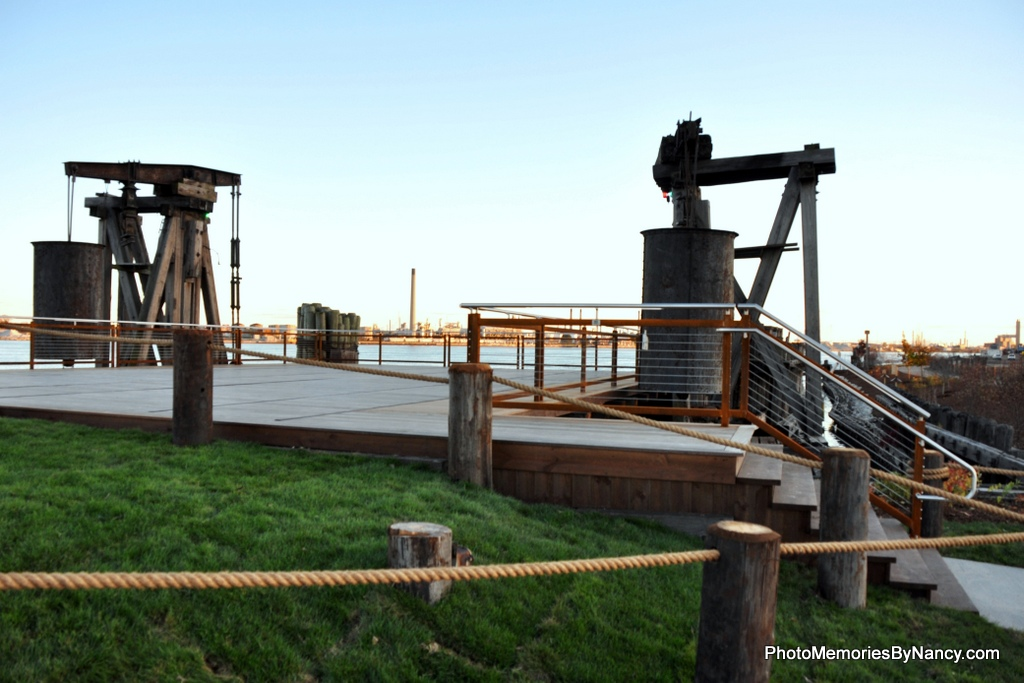
Restored Ferry Dock

Along the Blue Water River Walk is an old railroad ferry dock. This ferry dock has been completely restored and made available as a place to view the St. Clair River. The decking is made of Brazilian walnut and new railings, lighting, and stairs have been added. An old functioning railroad signal light welcomes visitors to the ferry dock.

=== Pedestrian trail ===
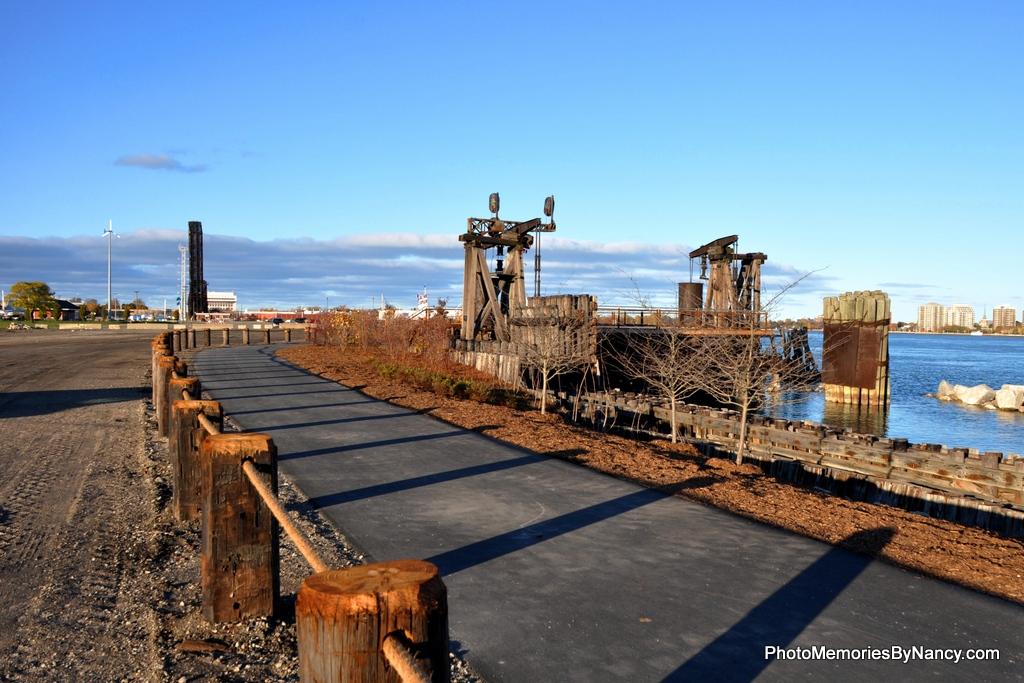
Pedestrian trail

A 10' wide asphalt trail runs the entire length of the Blue Water River Walk. For safety, bollards (posts) have been placed along the west edge of the trail to keep vehicles off the trail. These posts came from the old ferry dock fender (big wall) that was cut down in 2013. All of the old posts were separated and sorted and then cut to length to use on the trail.

This trail is a key component in the Bridge to Bay Trail—a trail that runs more than 50 miles from Lakeport State Park to New Baltimore.

=== Fishing pier ===
A fishing pier was added along the river walk in June 2015. Phase I of the project opened to the public July 4, 2015. This pier allows area anglers to cast their line 65 feet off shore. Phase II will be added at a later date.

=== Public art ===
During the summer of 2014, two pieces of public art were added to help tell the history of the Blue Water Area and to make the river walk more appealing to visitors. Stella Clair is a 1,500 lb. metal sturgeon that was fabricated by Michigan native Lou Rodriquez. Lake sturgeon can weigh anywhere between 30 and 100 pounds.

There are an estimated 30,000 adult sturgeon at the mouth of the St. Clair River. Nine reefs were installed in the middle channel of the St. Clair River to provide places for sturgeon spawning, in an effort to increase the fish population in the river.

Sugar, the Iron Horse is another piece of public art installed in 2014. Sugar is a 7-foot-tall horse created by artist James Oleson. Oleson is a sculptor and painter from Florida who has work placed all over the United States.
