= Malecón (disambiguation) =

A malecón (in Spanish), or jetty, is a man-made structure that protrudes from land out into water.

Malecón may also refer to:

- Esplanade, or promenade, a long, open, level area, usually next to a river or large body of water
- Malecón, Havana, Cuba
- Malecon (cocktail), named for the Havana Malecón
- Malecón, Puerto Vallarta, Jalisco, Mexico
  - Malecón Lighthouse
- Malecon Center, a complex of skyscrapers in Santo Domingo, Dominican Republic
- El Malecón, a football stadium in Torrelavega, Spain
