= Science and technology in Morocco =

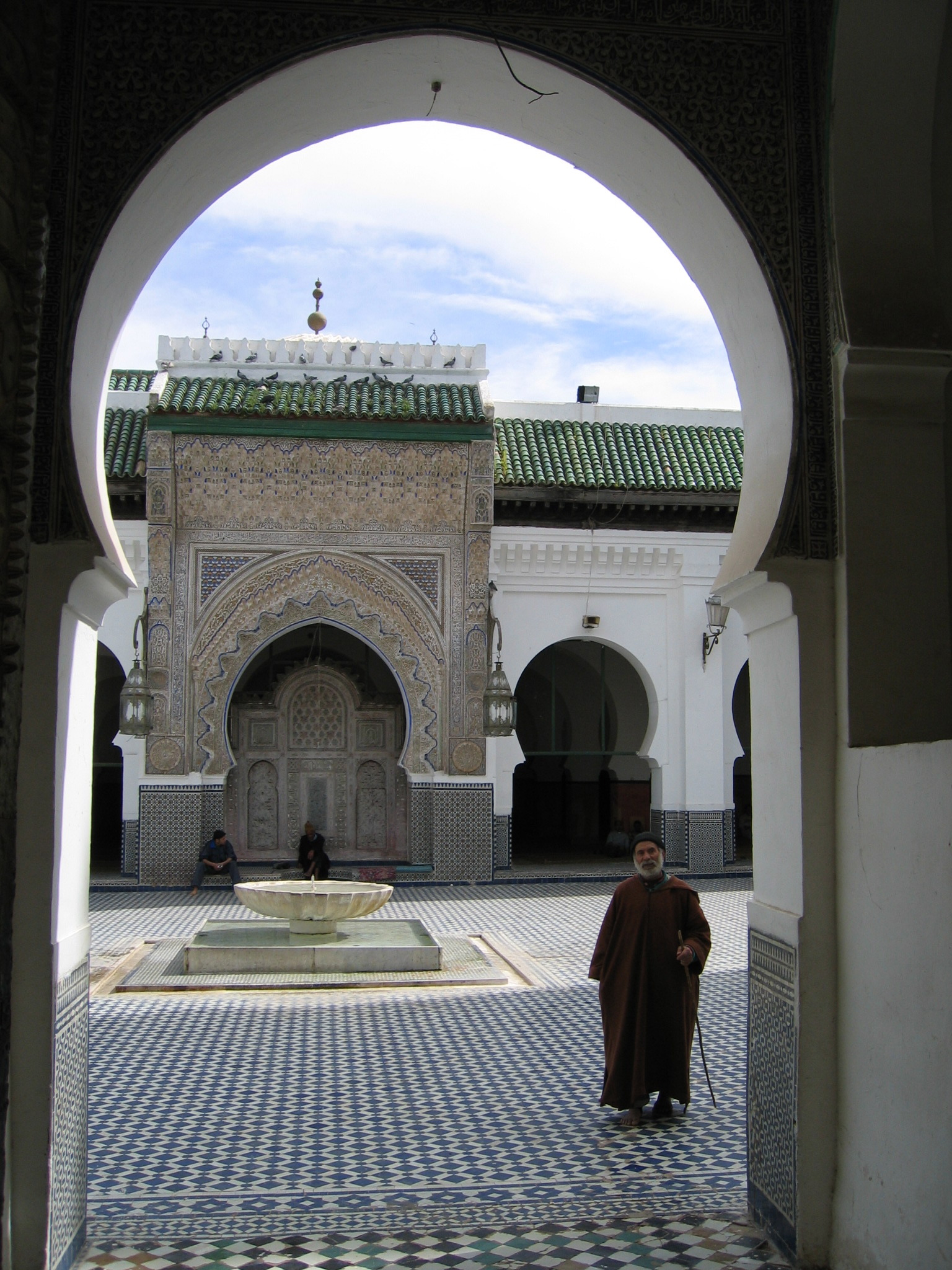
Interior of the Al-Karaouine mosque and university

Science and technology in Morocco has significantly developed in recent years. The Moroccan government has been implementing reforms to encourage scientific research in the Kingdom. While research has yet to acquire the status of a national priority in Morocco, the country does have major assets that could transform its R&D sector into a key vehicle for development. The industry remains dominated by the public sector, with the universities employing 58% of researchers. Morocco's own evaluation of its national research system – carried out in 2003 – revealed that the country has a good supply of well-trained, high-quality human resources and that some laboratories are of very high quality. However, the greatest gap at that time lay in the link between research and innovation. The educational qualifications of Moroccan researchers have increased significantly since the early 1990s. The University of Al-Karaouine is considered the oldest continuously operating academic degree-granting university in the world.

== National policy ==
=== Policy framework, 1999–2008 ===
The national system of scientific and technical research in Morocco is guided by different elements, such as the pronouncements of the King, reports of special commissions, five-year plans, and the creation of a special program for the support of research. While spending on education has hitherto been relatively high (5% of GDP and 24% of government expenditures in recent years), change has been slow in coming. A royally-designated "decade of education" was kicked off in Morocco in 1999 with the publication of the National Charter for Education and Training, a road map to sector reform. As a result, literacy for men aged 15–24 has risen from 84% in 1990 to 87% in 2008, according to the World Bank, while the percentage of all students completing primary school rose from 82% to 87% over the same period.

The Moroccan government’s Five-Year Plan for 2000-2004 articulated the priority areas for research. The declared objectives of this plan were to align scientific research with socio-economic development priorities. Sectors declared as priority areas were: agriculture, fisheries, drinking water, geology, mining, energy, environment, information and telecommunications technologies, and transport. This approach highlighted the need for effective institutional coordination, which enabled different parties to work together around common priority socio-economic objectives. In 2002, 89% of the 542 researchers in a sample comprising INRA, INRH, IAV Hassan II, ENFI, and ENA were trained to the postgraduate level and 34% held doctorates.

Morocco's national innovation system is centred around the Ministry of Higher Education and Scientific Research (MoHESR) and the Inter-Ministerial Permanent Committee on Scientific Research and Technological Development (est. 2002), together with the Hassan II Academy of Science and Technology (est. 2006). The National Centre for Scientific and Technical Research (CNRST) is another key player; it runs the National Support Program for Sectorial Research, for instance, which issues calls for research proposals to public institutions.

==== National Fund for R&D ====
The National Fund for Scientific Research and Technological Development was adopted by law in 2001. At the time, domestic enterprises funded just 22% of domestic research spending. The government encouraged companies to contribute to the fund to support research in their sector. Moroccan telecom operators were persuaded to cede 0.25% of their turnover; today, they finance about 80% of all public research projects in telecommunications supported through this fund. The financial contribution of the business enterprise sector to domestic research spending has meanwhile risen to 30% as of 2010.

==== Technopolis project ====
In 2005 the Moroccan king launched Technopolis Rabat, with the aim of creating 12,000–15,000 high-end jobs by 2016. The first phase was completed in 2006. The science park holds separate engineering, high-tech, colleges and R&D spaces. Several companies have started operating in the park, including Nemotek Technologie, EDS-HP, Cleanroom, and Alcatel. In 2009 Technopolis Oujda started construction, the first phase is to be completed in 2011. The technopolis includes four main components: “CleanTech” industrial and logistical park, a services center (off-shoring and services), a commercial platform (retail park and showrooms), and a training campus. The project is expected to create 20,000 job opportunities.

At the time of the launch of Technopolis Rabat, only six African countries (Morocco, Egypt, Senegal, Madagascar, Tunisia and South Africa) had initiated programs to develop technology parks as part of their strategy for sustainable development.

=== Policy framework, 2009–2025 ===
==== Vision for education and research ====
In 2009, the National Strategy for the Development of Scientific Research to 2025 recommended raising the secondary enrollment rate from 44% to at least 80% and the tertiary enrollment rate for 19–23 year-olds from 12% to over 50% by 2025. As of 2014, unemployment remained high, at over 9% and about 41% of the labour force lacked any qualification.

Arab government expenditure on education as a share of GDP. Source: UNESCO Science Report: towards 2030, Figure 17.8

In May 2009, Morocco's prime minister, Abbas El Fassi, announced greater support for science during a meeting at the National Centre for Scientific and Technical Research. The aim was to give universities greater financial autonomy from the government to make them more responsive to research needs and better able to forge links with the private sector, in the hope that this would nurture a culture of entrepreneurship in academia. He announced that investment in science and technology would rise from US$620,000 in 2008 to US$8.5 million (69 million Moroccan dirhams) in 2009, in order to finance the refurbishment and construction of laboratories, training courses for researchers in financial management, a scholarship program for postgraduate research and incentive measures for companies prepared to finance research, such as giving them access to scientific results that they could then use to develop new products.

The same year, the Moroccan government signed DH12.6bn (€1.1bn) in new agreements to improve the quality of its universities, as part of the National Education Emergency Support Program 2009–2012. This extra investment came as the number of students enrolled in science and engineering fields was expected to double by 2012, along with the number of those passing the baccalaureate exam after secondary school. The project ranged from hiring additional lecturers and raising teaching credentials to expanding general infrastructure. The government fixed the target of accrediting 92% of its universities as research institutions by 2012, compared to 69% in 2008.

On 20 May 2015, less than a year after its inception, the Higher Council for Education, Training and Scientific Research presented a report to the king offering a Vision for Education in Morocco 2015–2030. The report advocated making education egalitarian and, thus, accessible to the greatest number. Since improving the quality of education goes hand in hand with promoting research and development, the report also recommended developing an integrated national innovation system which would be financed by gradually increasing the share of GDP devoted to research and development ‘to 1% in the short term, 1.5% by 2025 and 2% by 2030’.

==== Moroccan Innovation Strategy ====
The Moroccan Innovation Strategy was launched at the country's first National Innovation Summit in June 2009 by the Ministry of Industry, Commerce, Investment and the Digital Economy. It has three main goals:

- to develop domestic demand for innovation;
- foster public–private linkages; and
- introduce innovative funding mechanisms, including Intilak for innovative start-ups and Tatwir for industrial enterprises or consortia.

Morocco managed to navigate the fallout from the 2008 financial crisis relatively well, with average growth of over 4% between 2008 and 2013. However, the export business was affected by the slowdown in the European economy since 2008, as Europe is the main destination for Moroccan exports. The Moroccan economy is diversifying but remains focused on low value-added products, representing about 70% of manufactured goods and 80% of exports. There are also signs of waning competitiveness in some areas. In recent years, Morocco has conceded market shares for clothing and shoes in the face of tough international competition from Asia, in particular, but managed to expand its market share for fertilizers, passenger vehicles and equipment for the distribution of electricity.

The Ministry of Higher Education and Scientific Research is supporting research in advanced technologies and the development of innovative cities in Fez, Rabat and Marrakesh. The Moroccan Innovation Strategy fixed the target of producing 1,000 Moroccan patents and creating 200 innovative start-ups by 2014. In parallel, the Ministry of Industry, Commerce and New Technologies (as it has since become) created a Moroccan Club of Innovation in 2011 in partnership with the Moroccan Office of Industrial and Commercial Property. The goal was to create a network of players in innovation, including researchers, entrepreneurs, students and academics, to help them develop innovative projects.

The government is encouraging citizen engagement in innovation on the part of public institutions. One example is the Moroccan Phosphate Office (Office chérifien des phosphates), which has invested in a project to develop a smart city, King Mohammed VI Green City, around Mohammed VI University located between Casablanca and Marrakesh, at a cost of DH 4.7 billion (circa US$479 million).

==== Status of policy implementation in 2020 ====
Morocco’s National Strategy for the Development of Scientific Research: towards 2025 (2009), its innovation strategy Maroc Innovation (2009) and its Vision for Education, 2015–2030 have striven to improve co-ordination among the key players of the national innovation system while diversifying support for research.

Accomplishments, as of 2020, include:

- the creation of the Innov Invest Fund in 2018 to support business incubators, via a World Bank loan (MAD 500 million, c. US$57 million);
- the creation of 26 collaborative platforms since the inception of the National Program for University–Industry Interface in 2004;
- and an increase in publication intensity overall and for cross-cutting strategic technologies since 2012.

The lack of private investment in research and the ageing research workforce remain challenges for the national innovation system.

==== University–business partnerships ====
As of 2015, Morocco had three technoparks, hosting start-ups and small and medium-sized enterprises. Since the first technopark was established in Rabat in 2005, a second has been set up in Casablanca and, in 2015, a third in Tangier. Like its two predecessors, the technopark in Tangier hosts companies specializing in information and communication technologies (ICTs), 'green' technologies (namely, environmentally friendly technologies) and cultural industries. In Tangier, offices in an existing building have been converted through a public–private partnership, at an estimated cost of 20 million dirhams (US$2 million). These offices should be able to accommodate up to 100 enterprises, which share the premises with some of the project's key partners, such as the Moroccan Entrepreneurial Network and the Association of Women CEOs of Morocco.

With university–business partnerships remaining very limited in Morocco, several competitive funds fostering this type of collaboration have been renewed in recent years. These include the following:

- The third InnovAct program was launched by the Moroccan Research Association in 2011, according to Erawatch. Whereas the program's two predecessors (launched in 1998 and 2005) had targeted small and medium-sized enterprises (SMEs), the new program has extended the beneficiary groups to include consortia of enterprises. SMEs are expected to pay 50–60% and consortia 80% of the project costs. The scheme encourages university–industry collaboration: companies receive logistical support and the financial means to recruit university graduates to work on their research project. The program aims to support up to 30 enterprises each year operating mainly in the following industries: metallurgical, mechanical, electronic and electrical; chemical and parachemical; agro-food; textiles; technologies for water and environment; aeronautics; biotechnology; nanotechnology; off-shoring; and automotive.
- The Hassan II Academy of Science and Technology funded 15 research projects in 2008 and 2009. Calls for research proposals encourage private–public collaboration and take into consideration the project's potential socio-economic impact or spillovers.
- The Ministry of Higher Education and Scientific Research places a number of poles of competence under contract for four years to bring together public and private research establishments on a joint project through its accredited laboratories. There were 18 poles of competence up until 2010 but these have since been whittled down to 11 after several did not meet the ministry's new criteria for funding. The networks include one on medicinal and aromatic plants, another on higher energy physics, a third on condensed matter and systems modelling and a fourth on neurogenetics.
- The Moroccan Spin-off and Incubation Network (Réseau Maroc incubation et essaimage) supports business incubation, in general, and technology transfer through university spin-offs, in particular. It provides start-ups with pre-seed capital to help them develop a solid business plan. The network is coordinated by the CNRST and grouped 14 incubators at some of the top Moroccan universities in 2015.

==== Public–private partnerships ====
The legal framework for public–private partnerships was updated in 2014, to support large infrastructure projects, then again in 2019 to extend these partnerships to local administrations and other public entities. In January 2020, the government launched a call for bids for three new industrial parks in the Casablanca-Settat region, to be developed via public–private partnerships.

== Strategic economic sectors ==
GDP per economic sector in the Arab world, 2013. Source: UNESCO Science Report: towards 2030 (2015), Figure 17.3

Manufacturing contributed 15.4% of GDP in 2013, about the same share as for Egypt. Agriculture contributed a further 16.6% to the Moroccan economy and services 54.9% of GDP. Industry overall (including manufacturing) contributed 28.5% of GDP.

In 2012, the Hassan II Academy of Science and Technology identified a number of sectors where Morocco has a comparative advantage and skilled human capital, including mining, fisheries, food chemistry and new technologies. It also identified a number of strategic sectors, such as energy, with an emphasis on renewable energies such as photovoltaic, thermal solar energy, wind and biomass; as well as the water, nutrition and health sectors, the environment and geosciences.

Total domestic expenditure on research and development in the Arab world, 2009 and 2013. Source: UNESCO Science Report: towards 2030, Figure 17.5

=== Renewable energy ===
In 2008, Morocco announced plans for a new campus to strengthen research and training in clean technology. The campus was to be part of a US$219 million clean energy industrial park being built in the city of Oujda to support private sector investment in renewable energy. Due to be completed in 2010, the 'knowledge campus' was part of a US$3.2 billion five-year renewable energy investment plan for 2009–2014 prepared by the Moroccan National Electricity Office.

Morocco is one of the ten founding members of the Regional Centre for Renewable Energy and Energy Efficiency established in Cairo, Egypt, in June 2008 (see Regional co-operation). In 2015, Morocco was expanding its investment in renewable energies. A total of DH 19 million (US$2 million) had been earmarked for six research projects in the field of solar thermal energy, under agreements signed by the Institute for Research Institute for Solar Energy and New Energies (IRESEN) with scientific and industrial partners. At the time, IRESEN was financing research in the field of renewable energy that was being conducted by more than 200 engineers and PhD students and some 47 university teachers-cum-researchers.

The Moroccan government has decided to compensate for the country's lack of hydrocarbons by becoming the leader in Africa for renewable energy by 2020. In 2014, it inaugurated the continent's biggest wind farm at Tarfaya in the southwest of the country. The government plans to create the world's biggest solar farm at Ouarzazate. The first phase, known as Noor I, was expected to be completed by October 2015. A consortium led by the Saudi Arabian company Acwa Power and its Spanish partner Sener won the call for tenders for the first phase and Acwa Power won the same for the second phase. It is estimated that it will cost the consortium nearly €2 billion to build and run Noor II (200 MW) and Noor III (150 MW). The project is also being funded by donors such as the German public bank Kreditanstalt für Wiederaufbau (€650 million) and the World Bank (€400 million). Ultimately, the Ouarzazate solar farm will have a capacity of 560 MW, with the government planning to produce 2 000 MW of solar power by 2020.

By 2018, renewable sources still only accounted for 3% of total energy consumption and one-third of installed electrical capacity.

In 2017, the Green Energy Park opened in Benguerir, a sustainable city situated 50 km north of Marrakech that has been under development since 2009, with the well-equipped Mohammed VI University at its heart. Built on an 8-hectare site, the Green Energy Park has been designed by the Research Institute for Solar Energy and New Energies. The park houses laboratories specializing in areas such as solar photovoltaics and desalination using solar energy. Morocco is also developing two solar parks with a total capacity of 320 MW, Noor Tafilalet and Noor Atlas.

The number of scientific publications on wind-turbine technologies has tripled from 148 (2012–2015) to 477 (2016–2019) and almost quadrupled for solar photovoltaics (from 145 to 569), according to the UNESCO study of 56 research topics.

=== Digital economy ===
In May 2019, the Digital Development Agency launched the Al Khawarizmi program. Endowed with a budget of MAD 50 million (c. US$5.6 million), the program promotes research and development in artificial intelligence and big data through calls for research proposals. It is also encouraging entrepreneurship and fostering the diffusion of digital tools through means such as digital parks and a smart factory.

== Research trends ==
=== Financial investment in research ===
Morocco devoted 0.73% of GDP to research and development (R&D) in 2010, up from 0.64% in 2006. This is one of the highest ratios in the Arab world but remains less than half the world average (1.7% of GDP in 2013).

In 2010, the business sector contributed 30% of domestic research spending, up from about 22% in 2001. Higher education contributed a further 45% of domestic research spending in 2010 and the government sector another 23%.Foreign sources contributed just 1.7% of domestic expenditure on research in 2010. Overall, the flow of foreign direct investment to Morocco has remained relatively steady since 2007, when it amounted to just over 3% of GDP. In 2013, it contributed 3.14% of GDP.

Some research in Morocco is driven by private-sector research performers, including the REMINEX Corporation (a subsidiary of Omnium Nord Africain) and Nemotek Technologie.

According to the Minister of Education, Vocational Training, Higher Education and Scientific Research, expenditure on R&D surged from 0.3% of GDP in 2016 to 0.8% in 2017, although these figures have not been independently verified.

Morocco was ranked 67th in the Global Innovation Index in 2025.

=== University graduates ===
In 2010, there were 75,744 university graduates in Morocco. Of these, just over one-third (27,524, or 36%) graduated in fields related to natural sciences, engineering and agriculture. Most graduated in natural sciences (17,046 students, or 62%), followed by engineering (9,393 students, or 34%). A further 1,085 students (4%) graduated in agricultural sciences. 22.5% of science graduates were women, compared to 12% of engineering graduates and 1.4% of agricultural graduates.

Each year, 18% of Moroccan graduates head mainly for Europe and North America; this trend has led to calls for foreign universities to be established in Morocco and for the development of prestigious campuses. The Hassan II Academy of Science and Technology helps Moroccan scientists to network with their national and international peers, in addition to its role of recommending research priorities and evaluating research programs.

Arab researchers and technicians (FTE) per million inhabitants, 2013 or closest year. Source: UNESCO Science Report: towards 2030 (2015), Figure 17.6

=== Researchers ===
According to the 2002-2003 annual report of the Ministry of National Education, Higher Education, Professional Training and Scientific Research, Morocco had 17 390 research staff. The majority (58%) were employed in the university sector. The total number of agricultural researchers in Morocco increased gradually throughout the 1980s and 1990s, while total agricultural R&D expenditure fluctuated somewhat erratically.

The number of researchers is rising fairly rapidly. In 2008, Morocco counted 20,703 researchers in full-time equivalents. This amounted to 669 researchers per million inhabitants. Three years later, there were 27,714 researchers in full-time equivalents, or 864 researchers per million inhabitants, compared to a world average of 1,083 per million. Despite the fact that technicians play a key role in technology-based manufacturing and maintenance, there were only 53 technicians per million inhabitants in 2011. In head counts, Morocco counted 29,276 researchers in 2008 and 36,732 in 2011. Some 27.6% of researchers were women in 2008 and 30.2% in 2011.

In 2011, Moroccan researchers were employed primarily in natural sciences (34%), social sciences (26%) and humanities (20%). The lack of jobs in engineering and technology (8% of total employment in research and development) reflects the fledgling culture of entrepreneurship and innovation in Morocco. A further 10% of researchers work in medical sciences and 2% in agriculture.

In 2016, Morocco counted 1,074 researchers per million inhabitants (in full-time equivalents), up from 1,024 in 2014. The global average for researchers per million inhabitants was 1,368 in 2018. In 2016, 33.8% of researchers in Morocco were female (measured in head counts). Women represented 33.3% of all researchers across the world in 2018.

Share of women Arab researchers, 2013. Source: UNESCO Science Report: towards 2030 (2015), Figure 17.7

=== Research output ===
The number of scientific articles catalogued in international journals has risen steadily since 2006, when these numbered 990. According to Thomson Reuters' Web of Science, there were 1,574 articles by Moroccan authors catalogued in its Science Citation Index Expanded in 2014. This corresponds to 47 per million inhabitants, which is towards the low end of the scale in the Arab world. Only Libya, Iraq, Syria, Sudan, Yemen, Mauritania and Palestine had a lower publication intensity in 2014. Qatar and Saudi Arabia have managed to increase their own scientific output and university rankings considerably since introducing incentive measures to attract top foreign scientists to their universities.

Moroccan articles were fairly evenly spread across all fields of natural and social sciences between 2008 and 2014, with medical sciences, physics and chemistry being the most prominent fields of research. Between 2008 and 2014, Morocco's main scientific partners were based in France (3,465 articles), Spain, (1,338), the United States (833), Italy (777) and Germany (752).

In 2019, Morocco published 7,203 articles indexed in the Scopus database. The broad field of cross-cutting strategic technologies accounted for 24% of Morocco's scientific output over 2017–2019. Over the same period, Morocco's top partners for scientific co-authorship were, in descending order, France, Spain, the USA, Italy and Canada.

Morocco leads the Arab region for the share of high-tech exports, according to the United Nations Statistics Division. After dipping to 6% of manufactured exports in 2008 due to the 2008 financial crisis, high-tech exports climbed back to 7.7% of manufactured exports in 2012.

The number of applications for patents remained stable between 2010 and 2012, with Morocco registering the greatest number of applications after Egypt. However, residents of Saudi Arabia applied for more patents than residents of Morocco over this period. The great majority of Moroccan patents were registered by non-residents, a situation common to all Arab countries (see table).

Over 2015–2019, the number of patents granted to Moroccan inventors from the world's top five patent offices (IP5) declined from 66 to 59.

Although applications to the national patent office surged by 167% over 2015–2019, applications from abroad were largely responsible for this trend, since domestic patent applications actually declined by 14% over the same period. Numbers were also down in 2019 at the top five patent offices. This suggests that the national innovation system is less effectively converting research results into concrete applications.

High-tech exports from the Arab world, 2006, 2008, 2010 and 2012. Source: UNESCO Science Report: towards 2030 (2015), Figure 17.1

Table: Patent applications in Arab states, 2010–2012

For countries with more than 15 patent applications

| | Patent applications residents | | | Patent applications non-residents | | | Total patent applications | | |
| | 2010 | 2011 | 2012 | 2010 | 2011 | 2012 | 2010 | 2011 | 2012 |
| Egypt | 605 | 618 | 683 | 1 625 | 1 591 | 1 528 | 2 230 | 2 209 | 2 211 |
| Morocco | 152 | 169 | 197 | 882 | 880 | 843 | 1034 | 1 049 | 1 040 |
| Saudi Arabia | 288 | 347 | - | 643 | 643 | | 931 | 990 | - |
| Algeria | 76 | 94 | 119 | 730 | 803 | 781 | 806 | 897 | 900 |
| Tunisia | 113 | 137 | 150 | 508 | 543 | 476 | 621 | 680 | 626 |
| Jordan | 45 | 40 | 48 | 429 | 360 | 346 | 474 | 400 | 394 |
| Yemen | 20 | 7 | 36 | 55 | 37 | 49 | 75 | 44 | 85 |
| Lebanon | - | - | - | 13 | 2 | 2 | 13 | 2 | 2 |

Source: UNESCO Science Report: towards 2030 (2015), Table 17.5

== Research institutions ==
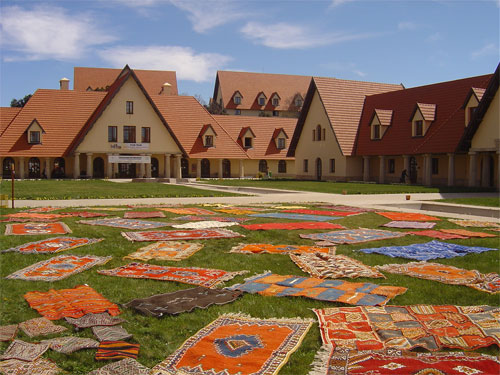
Al Akhawayn University, Ifrane

Research institutions include the Scientific Institute of Rabat, founded in 1920, which does fundamental research in the natural sciences, and the Scientific Institute of Maritime Fishing, founded in 1947 in Casablanca, which studies oceanography, marine biology, and topics related to development of the fishing industry. Nine universities and colleges offer degrees in basic and applied sciences. In 1987–97, science and engineering students accounted for 41% of college and university enrollments. Under the 2009 initiative by the Moroccan government, universities will be made financially independent from the government to make them more responsive to research needs and better able to forge links with the private sector. A total of 17 agreements were signed to develop Moroccan universities, as part of the 2009-2012 emergency program which aims to reform the country's ailing education system and foster a culture of entrepreneurship in the academic community.

The University of Al-Karaouine is a university located in Fes. Founded in 859 as a madrasah, the university is one of the leading spiritual and educational centers of the Muslim world.

== International co-operation ==
=== Bilateral co-operation ===
The Morocco-US science and technology (S&T) cooperation plan, signed in 2006 in Rabat, promotes the exchange of innovative scientific ideas, information and knowledge, skills and techniques and the training of technical experts. It also allows for joint scientific and technological projects, conferences and workshops.

Apart from the S&T agreement with the United States, Morocco has S&T agreements with its regional neighbour Tunisia and countries related to its historical heritage (France, Belgium, and Spain). Many Moroccan scientists received training in France or are performing research in collaboration with French scientists. In 2009 Morocco and South Korea agreed to strengthen cooperation in the fields of information and communications technology and cyber security. Morocco also signed an agreement on scientific and technical cooperation with Turkey.

In June 2009, a NASA scientific mission, including six Moroccan experts, visited Morocco with the aim of integrating Moroccan researchers into the global climate change initiative, Space Weather.

=== Multilateral co-operation ===
==== Arab Strategy for Science, Technology and Innovation ====
In March 2014, the Council of Ministers of Higher Education and Scientific Research in the Arab World endorsed the draft Arab Strategy for Science, Technology and Innovation at its 14th congress in Riyadh, Saudi Arabia. The strategy has three main thrusts: academic training in science and engineering, scientific research and regional and international scientific co-operation. One of the strategy's key objectives is to involve the private sector more in regional and interdisciplinary collaboration, in order to add economic and development value to research and make better use of available expertise. Up to now, science, technology and innovation policies in Arab states have failed to Catalyse knowledge production effectively or add value to products and services because they focus on developing research without taking the business community on board. There has also been a lot of talk about re-orienting the education system towards innovation and entrepreneurship but little action.

In the Arab Strategy for Science, Technology and Innovation, countries are urged to engage in greater international co-operation in 14 scientific disciplines and strategic economic sectors, including nuclear energy, space sciences and convergent technologies such as bioinformatics and nanobiotechnology. The Strategy advocates involving scientists from the diaspora and urges scientists to engage in public outreach; it also calls for greater investment in higher education and training to build a critical mass of experts and staunch brain drain. The Strategy nevertheless eludes some core issues, including the delicate question of who will foot the hefty bill of implementing the strategy.

==== Regional Centre for Renewable Energy and Energy Efficiency ====
Morocco is one of the ten founding members of the Regional Centre for Renewable Energy and Energy Efficiency, established in Cairo, Egypt in June 2008. The centre acts as a platform for regional exchanges on policy and technical issues. It also encourages private-sector participation to promote the growth of a regional industry in renewable energy. The other eight founding partners are Algeria, Jordan, Lebanon, Libya, Palestine, Syria, Tunisia and Yemen. The centre has several development partners, including the European Union, the German Agency for Technical Co-operation and the Danish International Development Agency.

The Ouarzazate Solar Power Station was built between 2016 and 2018 with funding from some Arab countries.

==== Islamic World Academy of Sciences ====
Morocco is a member of the Organisation of the Islamic Conference (OIC). In 1986, a handful of scientists persuaded the OIC and others in the developing world to create the Islamic World Academy of Sciences (IAS), headquartered in Amman, Jordan. This independent, apolitical, non-governmental organization receives seed funding from Jordan and raises funds for its activities from the OIC and other international bodies, including United Nations agencies. The IAS combines three functions:

- a learned society that promotes the values of modern science;
- a funding agency to support outstanding scientists conducting imaginative and far-reaching research (a function not yet fully realized); and
- a leader of the scientific community of OIC member countries in its relations with governments, scientific societies and academies of sciences worldwide.

== Sources ==
This article incorporates text from a free content work. Licensed under CC-BY-SA IGO 3.0. Text taken from UNESCO Science Report: towards 2030, 431-469, UNESCO, UNESCO Publishing.

This article incorporates text from a free content work. Licensed under CC BY-SA 3.0 IGO (license statement/permission). Text taken from UNESCO Science Report: the Race Against Time for Smarter Development, 422-465, UNESCO Publishing.
