= Nnadi Samuel =

Nigerian poet

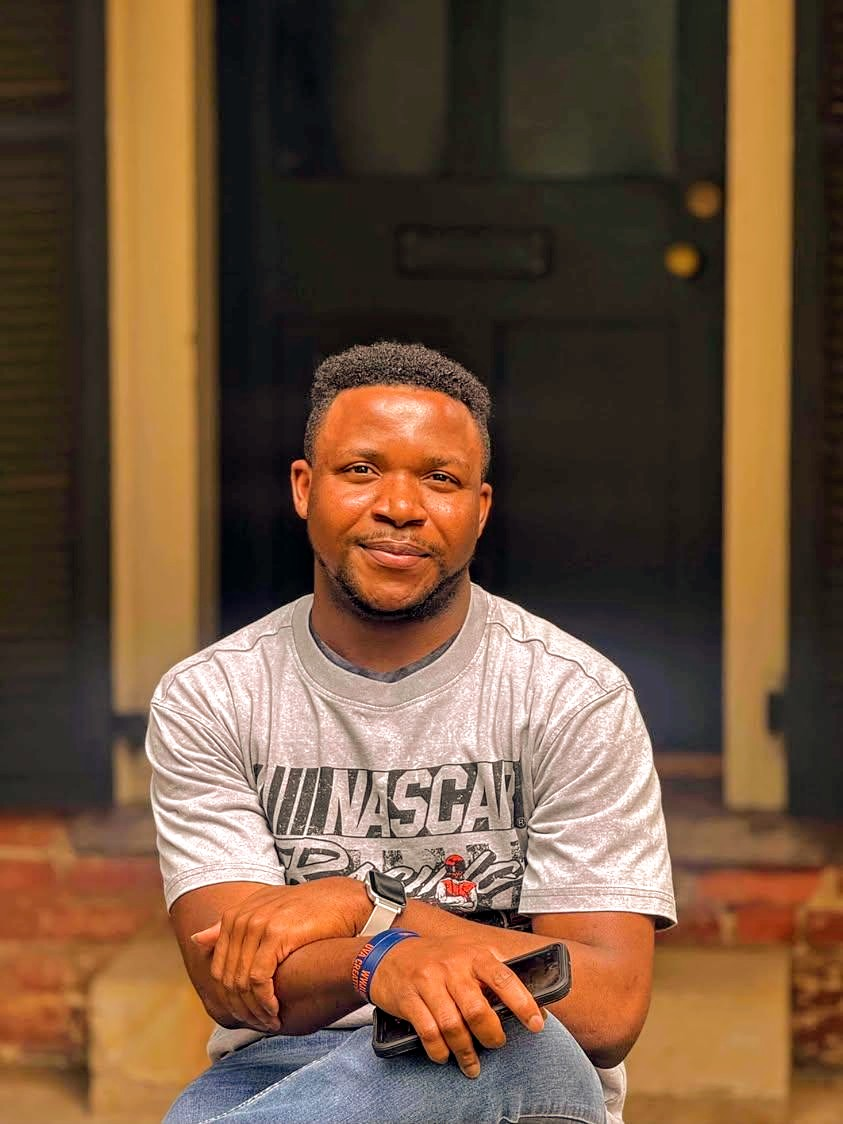
- Nnadi Samuel is sitting under a Pavilion building in Charlottesville
- Born: 4 May; Ijesha, Lagos
- Education: University of Benin (BA), 2019
- Occupation: Poet. Instructor. Editor
- Writing career
- Notable works: Nature Knows a Little About Slave Trade (Sundress Publication, 2023) Biblical Invasion (Bywords publication, 2024)
- Notable awards: The 2022 Betsy Colquitt Poetry Award, The 2023 John Newlove Poetry Award, The 2023 Stacy Doris Memorial Award (San Francisco State University (SFSU) and The 2025 Capilano Review Fall Award

Nnadi Samuel is a Nigerian poet. He is the author of the chapbooks Reopening of Wounds (2020), Nature Knows a Little About Slave Trade (2023), which won the Editor's choice Award for the 2022 Chapbook Contest selected for publication by Sundress Publications., and Biblical Invasion, B.C (Bywords Publication, 2024). His honors includes the 2022 Betsy Colquitt Award, the 2023 John Newlove Poetry Award, the 2023 Stacy Doris Memorial Poetry Award(San Franscisco State University(SFSU). and the 2025 Capilano Review Fall Award amongst others. His works have appeared in several reputable journals and magazine.

== Early life and education ==
Nnadi Samuel grew up in Ikotun, Lagos. He holds a Bachelor of Arts degree in English and Literature from the University of Benin in 2019.

== Writing career ==
Nnadi started writing in 2018, but began submitting to magazines and journal in early 2020. The same year, his first chapbook, Reopening of Wounds, was published in Nigeria by Words, Rhyme & Rhythm. He is the author of Nature knows a little about Slave Trade selected by Tate N. Oquendo (Sundress Publication, 2023). His third micro-chapbook Biblical Invasion, BC published Bywords Publication (Ottawa CA, 2024).

Nnadi's works have been published in many reputable platforms including Common Wealth Writers, Scottish Poetry Library, Fourteen Hills, Suburban Review, Seventh Wave Magazine, The Spectacle Magazine, ROOM Magazine, Porter House Review, The Capilano Review, Ex-Puritan, River Heron Review, Westerly, Arc Poetry Magazine, Prism, Southword Journal, Yolk Literary Journal, FIYAH Literary Magazine, Fantasy Magazine, Fairy Tale Review, New Orleans Review, Poetry Ireland Review, North American Review, Bombay Lit Magazine, 128 LIT, Shade Literary Arts, Descant, North Dakota Quarterly, Quarterly West, Gutter Magazine, Rough Cut Press, Lolwe, Uncanny Magazine, Agbówo, Alphabet Box among others.

== Recognition and awards ==
Nnadi has received numerous awards and honors recognizing his contributions to poetry and African literature:

- Winner, The 2025 Capilano Review Fall Contest Award
- Winner, The 2025 F(r)iction Poetry Contest Fall
- Winner, The 2023 Virginia Tech Center for Refugee, Migrants and Displacement Studies Annual Award
- Winner, The 2023 Stacy Doris Memorial Poetry Award.
- Winner, The 2023 John Newlove Poetry Award
- Winner, The 2023 Vera Manuel Award for Poetry
- Winner, The 2022 Betsy Colquitt Poetry Award.
- Winner, The 2022 Angela C. Mankiewicz Poetry Contest.
- Winner, The 2022 River Heron Editors' Prize with his poem "Who Killed Davey Moore?",
- Winner, The 2021 Taiwanese American Falun Gong Poetry Prize for his manuscript titled "Subject Lessons".
- Winner, The 2021 Lakefly Poetry Contest
- Winner, The 2021 Penrose Poetry Prize
- Winner, The 2021 Miracle Monocle Award for Ambitious Student Writers
- Winner, The 2020 Open Drawer (August) Contest
- Second prize Winner for the 2022 The Bird in Your Hands Contest,
- Second prize Winner for the 2022 MONO. Poetry Prize
- Bronze Prize winner for the 2022 Creative Future Writer's Award.
- Honorable mention for the 2022 Stephen A. DiBiase Poetry Contest.
- Nnadi is an eight times Pushcart nominee and four times Best of the Net nominee

In 2022, Samuel was a bronze poetry winner of the Creative Future Writers' Award. He also received an honourable mention in the 2022 Stephen A. DiBiase Poetry Contest for "Nebulous Strike in Minnesota".

In 2023, Nnadi was announced as the winner of 2023 John Newlove Poetry Award and the 2022 Betsy Colquitt Poetry Award. His poem "A Boneyard of Flesh//Post-War Trauma" was judged winner of the 2023 Stacy Doris Memorial Poetry Award.[24][25] He won the 2023 Virginia Tech Center for Refugee, Migrants and Displacement Studies Annual Award.[26] His poem "At Washington D.C, A Black Boy Drank Borders" won the 2025 Capilano Review Fall Contest. His poem "Rewriting Athena" also won the F(r)iction Poetry Contest Fall 2025.

Reviewing Nature Knows A Little About Slave Trade in The Republic, the Nigerian critic Ancci recognises Nnadi's poetic distinction

== Reference ==
- Lakanse, Obakanse, Olusegun (March 2026). "Exploring Non-Heteronormative Elements in Nigerian Confessional Poetry: A Reading of Nnadi Samuel and Logan February's Poetry". International Journal Of Religion And Human Relations(Research Gate). Research Gate: 20.
- Ohaeto, Ezenwa. "Exploring Non-Heteronormative Elements in Nigerian Confessional Poetry: A Reading of Nnadi Samuel and Logan February's Poetry". International Journal Of Religion And Human Relations.
