= R. L. Paschal High School =

School in Fort Worth, Texas, United States

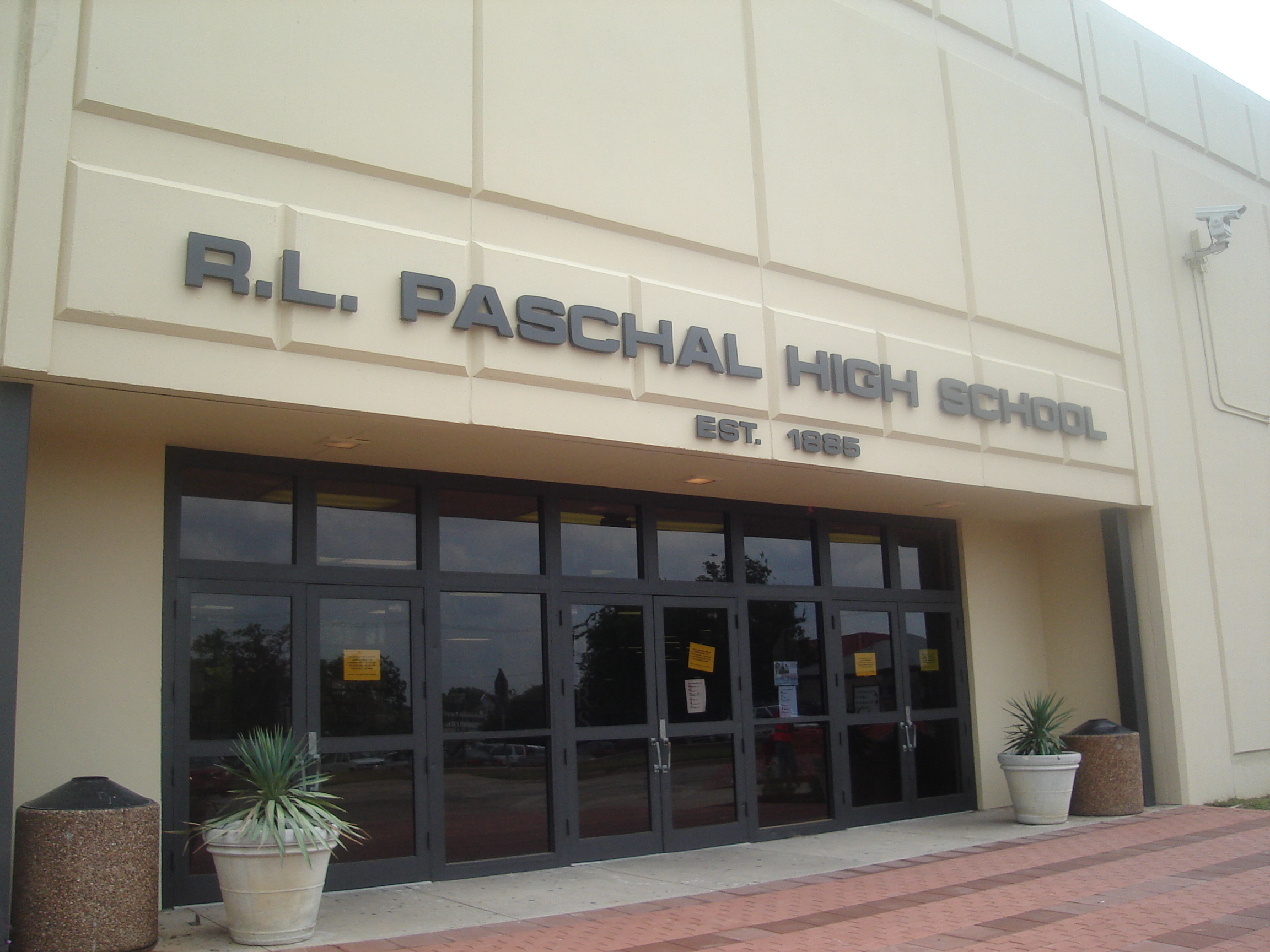
- The front entrance to PHS

Location
- 3001 Forest Park Boulevard; Fort Worth, Texas, Tarrant County 76110; United States

Information
- Type: Mixed-sex education, State school, Secondary school
- School district: Fort Worth Independent School District
- Teaching staff: 127.59 ((on an FTE basis)
- Enrollment: 2,127 (2024–2025)
- Student to teacher ratio: 16.67
- Colors: Purple and white
- Mascot: Panther
- Website: www.fwisd.org/Paschal

R. L. Paschal High School is a secondary school in Fort Worth, Texas, United States. It is part of the Fort Worth Independent School District, and is the oldest and largest high school in Fort Worth ISD.

The school is ranked 322nd in Texas and 3,892nd in the United States for best quality of education (in 2022) by U.S. News & World Report.

The following elementary schools feed into Paschal: Alice Carlson, George C. Clarke, Lily B. Clayton, Contreras, Daggett, De Zavala, South Hills, Tanglewood, Westcliff, Richard J Wilson, Overton Park, and Worth Heights.

The following middle schools feed into Paschal: Daggett Montessori, Daggett, McLean, McLean 6th Grade, Rosemont, and Rosemont 6th Grade.

== History ==
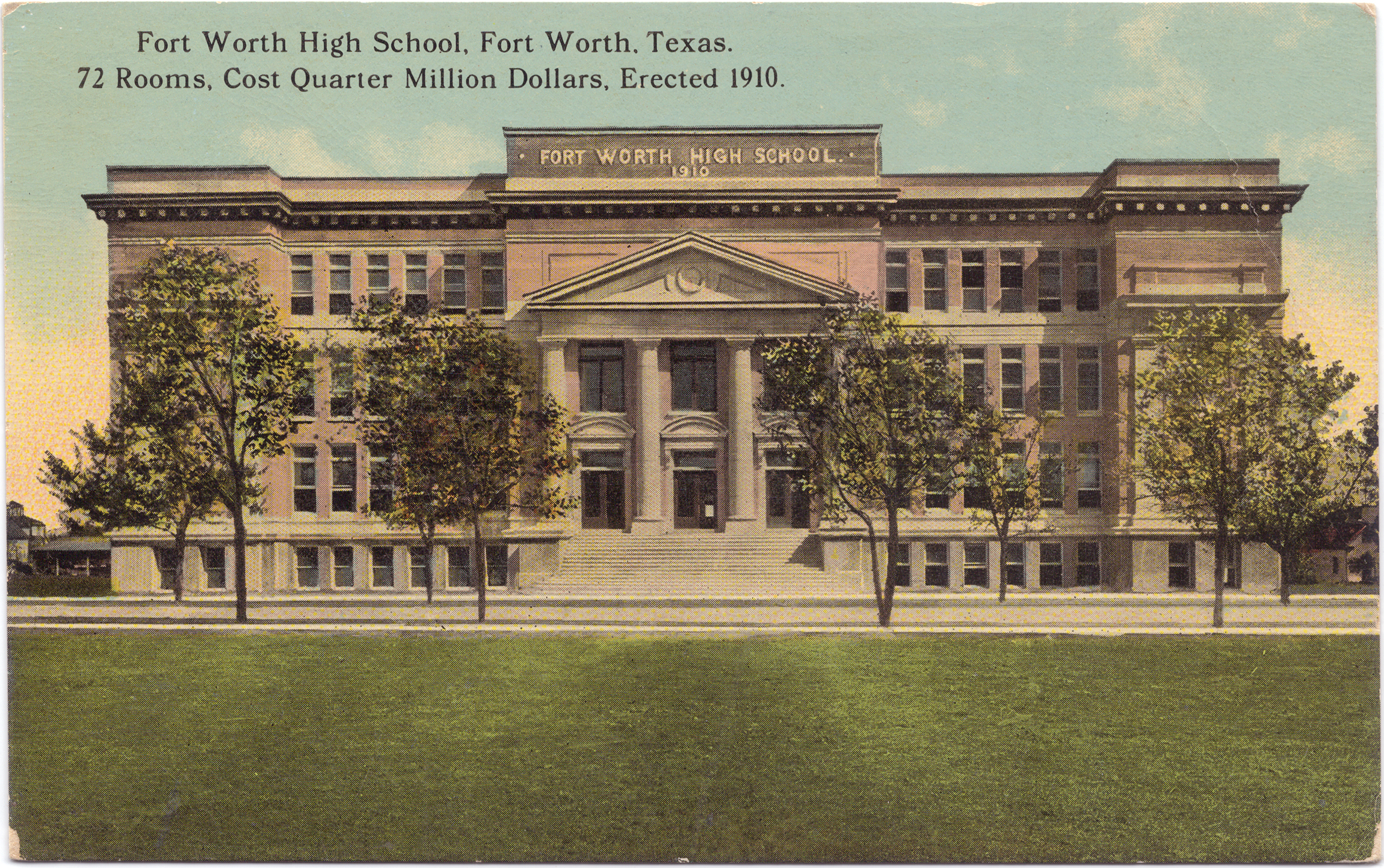
Postcard of Fort Worth High School, undated

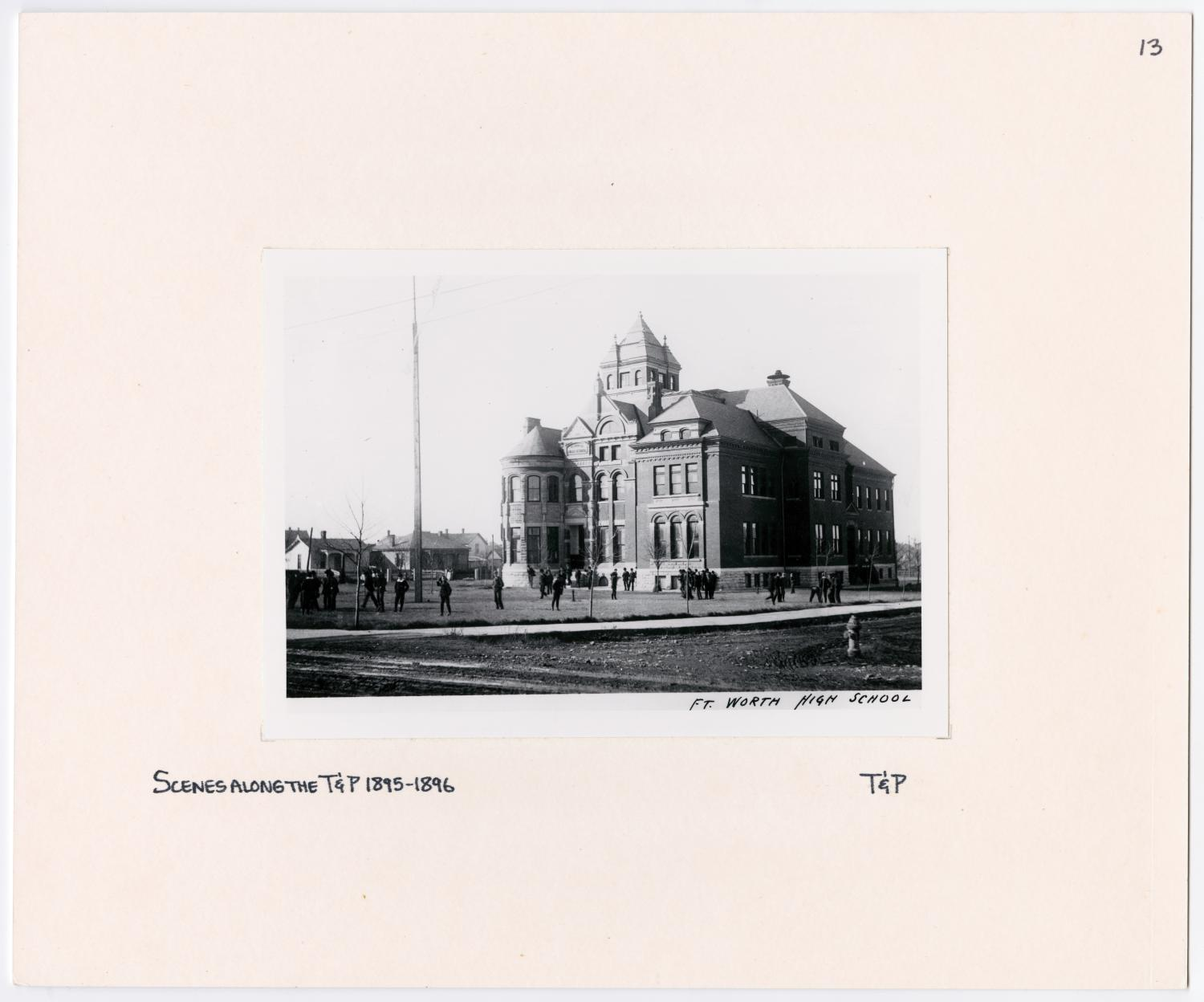
Fort Worth High School Photographed in 1895-96

- Fort Worth High School
- U.S. National Register of Historic Places
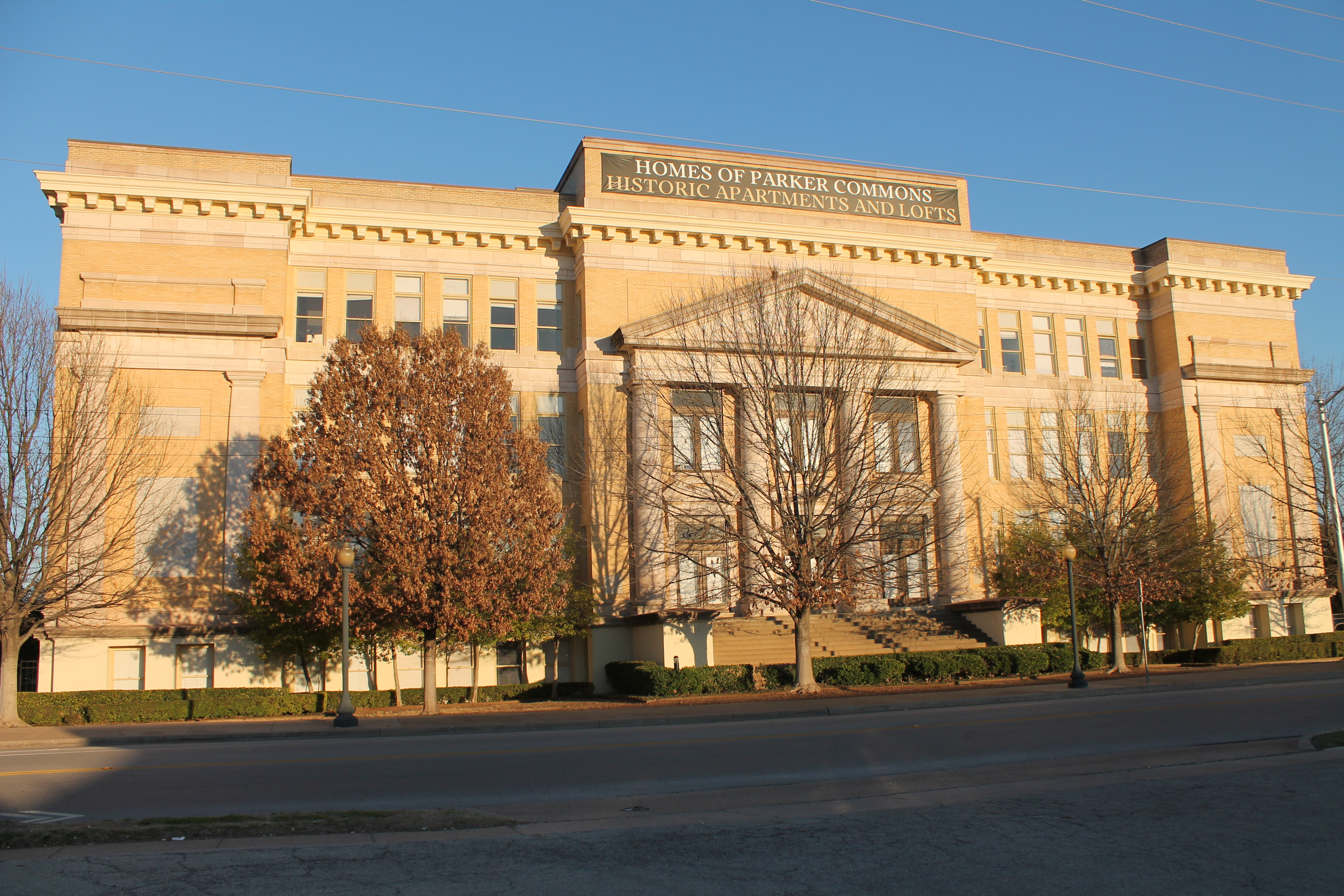
- Former Fort Worth High in 2015

- Location within Texas Location within the United States
- Location: 1015 S. Jennings Ave., Fort Worth, Texas
- Coordinates: 32°44′08″N 97°19′46″W
- Area: 1.2 acres (0.49 ha)
- Built: 1911; 115 years ago
- Built by: Innis--Graham
- Architect: Waller and Field
- Architectural style: Neoclassical architecture
- NRHP reference No.: 02001515
- Added to NRHP: December 12, 2002; 23 years ago

The school originated as the city's first secondary school, Fort Worth High School, which opened in 1882. Fort Worth High School was originally located at 200 Jennings. Robert Lee Paschal, an attorney from North Carolina, became head teacher in 1906. Briefly known as Central High School, it moved to its current location on Forest Park Boulevard in 1955. When Principal Paschal retired in 1935, the school was renamed in his honor as RL Paschal High School.

Its rival is Arlington Heights High School in west Fort Worth, and this is one of the oldest and most historic high school rivalries in Texas. In 1963, a prank on Arlington Heights led to 46 arrests, and a Heights High School bonfire being the center of a near riot. In the incident, carloads of Paschal boys and exes descended on a crowd of 500 Heights students at Benbrook Lake with an armory of weapons including baseball bats, lead pipes, whips and Molotov cocktails. A private-plane flyover by a 20-year-old pilot, a 1962 Paschal graduate, dropped rolls of school-color purple-and-white toilet paper that fluttered down onto the Heights crowd, and a 1948 sedan covered in gasoline-soaked mattresses and labeled “The Panther Ram Car” was set afire by a burly graduate and rolled toward the bonfire woodpile. There was also a ground assault by boys with bows and arrows, storming over the spillway and sailing arrows in a scene a county deputy compared to a frontier Native American attack. When all was said and done there was only one injury, when wrecker driver Junior Slayton, 33, was grazed by buckshot while towing away a student’s car. One week later, a visiting President John F. Kennedy smiled and asked at the mention of Paschal High School, “Isn’t that the school with its own air force?”

On November 19, 1969 Apollo 12 astronaut, Alan Bean, a 1950 Paschal graduate, took a Paschal High School flag to the moon with him and safely returned it to Earth. He donated the flag to the school, where it was displayed for decades.

In 1979, a Paschal student stole a bulldozer from a county construction site and rammed it into the Arlington Heights field house the day before the annual Heights-Paschal football game, severely damaging the field house.

In 1985, the school achieved a degree of notoriety when a gang called "Legion of Doom" was active at the school.

In 2006, the school won the Boys golf state championship.

== Performing arts ==
Paschal has a competitive show choir, "Ultraviolet". In 2023 the Paschal Cheer Squad won the 6A D2 UIL State Championship.

== Notable alumni ==
- Norman Alden — actor
- Audrey Anderson — actress
- Charlie Applewhite — singer and radio host
- Quincy Armstrong — former professional football player
- Nancy Lee Bass — "First Lady of Fort Worth", philanthropist
- Alan Bean — astronaut, walked on the Moon during Apollo 12
- Jim Bronstad — MLB pitcher
- T Bone Burnett — musician
- Lila Cockrell — first woman mayor of a major metropolis in the United States
- Betsy Colquitt — English professor and poet
- Donald Curry — professional boxer
- Abb Curtis — Basketball All-American, official, administrator
- Tim Curry — former DA of Tarrant County
- Price Daniel — Governor of Texas 1957–1963 and US Senator
- Mike DeBardeleben — kidnapper, rapist, counterfeiter, and suspected serial killer
- Aaron Dismuke — voice actor for Funimation
- Germán Durán — MLB player
- Kaylon Geiger — NFL Player
- John Howard Griffin — writer of Black Like Me
- Gayle Hunnicutt — actress
- Dan Jenkins — sports writer
- Patti Karr — Broadway actress
- Joe Don Looney — football player
- Ernest R. May — historian of international relations
- Morton Meyerson — CEO of Electronic Data Systems, CTO of General Motors, namesake of Dallas's Meyerson Symphony Center
- Hoby Milner — MLB player and pitcher
- Jeff Newman — MLB player and manager
- Charlie Mary Noble — astronomer and teacher
- Bill Owens — 1999–2007 Governor of Colorado
- Dan Hewitt Owens — actor
- Ben Hogan — professional golfer
- Charles F. Pendleton — US Army recipient of Medal of Honor
- John Peterson — PGA golfer
- Richard Rainwater — billionaire investor
- Ginger Rogers — actress
- Frank Ryan — NFL quarterback
- Edward Dickson Reeder — artist
- Taylor Sheridan — actor, screenwriter, and director
- Bud Shrake — sports journalist, author, and screenwriter
- Kathy Suder — artist
- Liz Smith — gossip columnist and author
- Charles D. Tandy — founder of Tandy Corporation (now Radio Shack)
- Karen T. Taylor — forensic and portrait artist
- Morton H. Meyerson — president of Electronic Data Systems, CTO General Motors
- Tommy Thompson — NFL player
- Bror Utter — artist
- Von Wafer — basketball player

== Rivalries ==
- Arlington Heights High School (the oldest ongoing high school rivalry in Texas history).
