= Centurion Computer Corporation =

American information technology company

- The Centurion Computer Corporation logo as used in the 1980s
- Formerly: Warrex Computer Services; Warrex Corporation
- Type: Division
- Industry: Information technology
- Founded: 1971; 55 years ago
- Founder: John Warren
- Fate: Acquired by Electronic Data Systems
- Headquarters: Richardson, Texas, United States
- Area served: USA
- Services: Computer services
- Number of employees: 300
- Parent: Electronic Data Systems (1981–1984)
- Divisions: Warrex Computer Corporation

Centurion Computer Corporation, or simply Centurion, was a manufacturer of small business computers that was founded in 1971 and eventually acquired by Electronic Data Systems (EDS).

== History ==
Centurion was incorporated in Richardson, Texas, in 1972, under the name Warrex Corporation. It was the successor to Warrex Computer Services, a company founded in 1971 by John Warren. Initially, it provided consulting and programming services. In 1972, Centurion entered the business of selling and supporting magnetic tape cassette systems. It sold these computer systems through another company, Warrex Computer Corporation, also based in Richardson. By August 1974, Centurion had designed and manufactured its first minicomputer, combined it with peripherals and software, and delivered it as the initial member of the Centurion family of small business computers. Unlike larger computer systems companies, Warrex sold its systems through independent dealers across the United States exclusively. In winter 1976, Warrex Computer Corporation expanded into a second branch office in Fort Worth, Texas.

After Warren died suddenly in June 1976, he was replaced as president and CEO by Brendan Morgan. The company formally changed its name from Warrex to Centurion Computer Corporation in March 1980. In March 1981, Electronic Data Systems (EDS) purchased Centurion for $7 million. Shortly after the acquisition, Centurion opened up its first international division in Scarborough, Ontario, in Canada, headed by David Snell. Centurion of Ontario was one of the few Canadian minicomputer manufacturers active at the time, competing with Geac Computer and MLPI Business Systems (both also of Toronto).

After roughly three years under ownership of EDS, a group of 12 investors who previously worked for Centurion (including some co-founders) bought back the company from EDS. This group of investors was headed by James H. Smith, who was named president of the new Centurion following the buyback. The terms of the buyback were undisclosed. The company immediately announced plans to release updated minicomputers and to increase the number of its authorized resellers.

A year after becoming independent again, Centurion Computer Corporation filed for Chapter 11 bankruptcy in the United States. In November 1985, it submitted its reorganization plans to the bankruptcy courts of Texas and was allowed to exit bankruptcy. By February 1986, it was down to ten employees.

== Business computers ==
Over its lifetime, Centurion produced an entire series of small business computers. The following is a partial list with the capabilities of each series and prices taken from February 1982.

Centurion minicomputers
Name	CPU	Memory	Floppy	Hard disks	CRTs	Minimum price	First delivery
MicroPlus	CPU-5	64 KiB	1-2	1x 8/24 MiB Winchester	2	$11,387	1982-01
Series 200	CPU-5	32 KiB	0-2	2x 10-20 MiB Hawk/Pertec	4	$27,668	1979-03
Series 6200	CPU-6	64-128 KiB	0-2	4x 10-20 MiB Hawk/Pertec	8	$34,742	1979-10
Series III	CPU-5	32-64 KiB	0	2x 10-20 MiB Hawk/Pertec	4	$35,342	1975
Series 6300	CPU-6	64-256 KiB	0-4	4x 10-20 MiB Hawk/Pertec	32	$37,628	1979-10
Series 6400	CPU-6	64-256 KiB	0-4	8x 26-96 MiB Finch/Phoenix	32	$41,465	1979-10
Series 6500	CPU-6	64-128 KiB	0-4	2x 26-96 MiB Finch/Phoenix	8	$45,545	1979-10

By default, all Centurion systems (except the MicroPlus) were equipped with at least one four-port multiplexer (MUX) which provides four channels of asynchronous control for the keyboard, printer, CRTs, or remote units (via Modem cards). Each device was on its own independent channel and operated independently of all other devices. Data transfer was either in low-speed mode under software control or high-speed mode with Direct Memory Access at a rate up to 1.2 MiB/second.

All Centurion systems used customized video display units to interface with the computer. Available types were R-40, R-100 or CT-520. They all communicated via RS-232 or modem at a speed of 1920 to 9600 baud with the main computer. Printers were supported via teletype or specialized controller cards supporting off-the-shelf printers like the TI-810, TI-840 or DP-B-600 printers capable of speeds from 75 chars/sec up to 600 lines/minute (~800-1300 chars/sec).

== Compatible storage systems ==
Centurion did not create custom storage media. Instead they manufactured storage controllers for existing off-the-shelf systems, mostly created by the Control Data Corporation (CDC).

Storage Media
Name	Type	Size	Price
CDC 9400 SSDD	8" floppy disk	0.6 MiB	$950
Qume DSDD	8" floppy disk	1.2 MiB	$1,683
CDC Hawk 9427	hard disk	10.4 MiB	$12,215
CDC Falcon 9414	hard disk	10.4 MB	N/A
CDC Finch	hard disk	8-24 MiB	N/A
Pertec D3000E	hard disk	20.8 MiB	$12,215
CDC Phoenix CMD-32 disk drive	hard disk	26.5 MiB	$7,600
CDC Phoenix CMD-64 disk drive	hard disk	52,9 MiB	$9,050
CDC Phoenix CMD-96 disk drive	hard disk	79.4 MiB	$9,960

Prices were taken from 1982, unless otherwise indicated. The disk size column shows the usable storage space on the device. All Centurion computers used 400 byte data blocks with the rest of the native block size being used for control structures like checksums.

== IBM compatible PC clone ==
As a division of EDS, Centurion also created an IBM PC–compatible clone as part of a negotiation strategy of EDS with IBM. EDS intended to acquire PCs from IBM, but didn't like IBM's pricing. To persuade IBM that their initial cost-per-unit offer was too high, EDS tasked Centurion to build a fully compatible PC clone from off-the-shelf parts at a lower price, even though EDS had no intention of starting to compete with IBM. The effort succeeded and IBM reduced their price offer, rather than to contend with another competitor in the market.

== Restoration efforts ==
As part of the vintage computer movement, David Lovett of the YouTube channel Usagi Electric is running a project to restore several Centurion microcomputers to working condition.
