= Morton Meyerson =

American corporate executive (1938–2025)

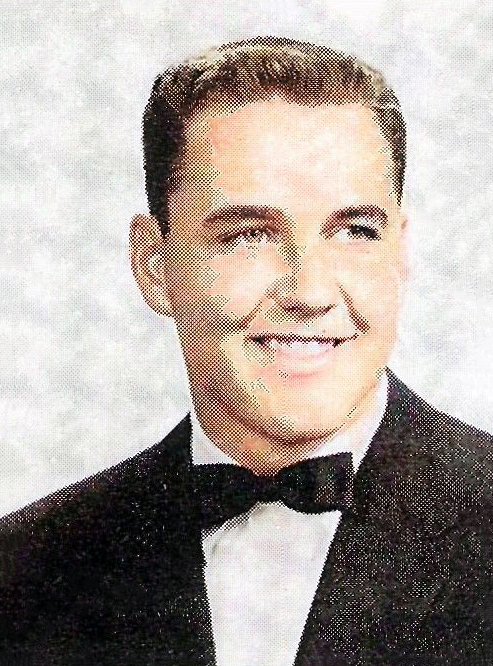
- Meyerson in 1956
- Born: Morton Herbert Meyerson; June 3, 1938; Fort Worth, Texas, U.S.
- Died: August 5, 2025 (aged 87); Dallas, Texas, U.S.
- Education: University of Texas at Austin (BA)
- Occupation: Businessman
- Spouse: Marlene Nathan (m. 1964; died 2017)
- Children: 2

Morton Herbert Meyerson (June 3, 1938 – August 5, 2025) was an American computer industry executive who held positions in the Ross Perot–founded Electronic Data Systems and subsequently at Perot Systems and General Motors. Ross Perot paid $10 million for naming rights to Morton H. Meyerson Symphony Center, home to the Dallas Symphony Orchestra.

== Early life and education ==
Meyerson was born in Fort Worth, Texas, on June 3, 1938, to a Jewish family. His ancestors immigrated to the United States from Belarus. His mother was a pianist and actively volunteered at the Fort Worth VA Hospital. His father owned Meyerson insurance agency. When he was 10, Morton's brother Sandy died from cancer.

Meyerson attended Paschal High School, where he played football, sang in the choir, and was senior class president. He then graduated from The University of Texas at Austin with a Bachelor of Arts degree in economics and philosophy. At UT, he was a member of Sigma Alpha Mu, Texas Cowboys, the UT chorus, and student government. In 1991, he was a recipient of the Pro Bene Meritus Award presented by the UT College of Liberal Arts and in 2005 he was a recipient of The University of Texas Distinguished Alumnus Award. After college, Meyerson served as an officer in the United States Army with an occupational specialty involving automatic data processing. Meyerson served in the U.S. Army active reserves from 1963 through 1969.

== Career ==
Meyerson began working for Bell Helicopter in 1963. He then worked at Electronic Data Systems, Inc. (EDS) from 1966 to 1971, leaving the company as President and Vice Chair leading over 50,000 employees. In 1967, Meyerson proposed a business model that would later become known as outsourcing, and helped Ross Perot secure and execute a contract to process Medicaid claims for Texas Blue Cross Blue Shield, both of which led to major business growth for EDS. During Meyerson's tenure as CEO of EDS from 1979 to 1985, EDS grew from a $200 million consulting business into a $4.7 billion large-scale systems consulting enterprise generating over $190 million in earnings. In 2013 Morton was inducted into The Outsourcing Hall of Fame of the International Association of Outsourcing Professionals.

He was CEO of duPont Glore Forgan, a Wall Street brokerage firm, from 1971 through 1974.

In 1984, he became the chief technology officer at General Motors. He retired in 1986 to pursue foundation work and mentoring entrepreneurs. During this period, Meyerson mentored Michael Dell during the early years of Dell Computer. He also mentored Mark Cuban and Todd Wagner, as a principal investor in Broadcast.com investing $500,000 for a 10% share.

In 1992, Morton re-joined the corporate world as Chair and CEO of Perot Systems. He retired from Perot Systems in 1998. He was subsequently chairman of 2M Companies, Inc. and of The Morton H. Meyerson Family Foundation. The foundation is the charitable giving arm for his philanthropic projects, including Dream Big, which helps provide scholarships for high school graduates in Fort Worth, and the Hilleman Scholars Program at Montana State University, for first-generation students.

Meyerson served on the board of the Dallas Symphony Association and was Vice Chairman Emeritus of the National Park Foundation. He was a Fellow of the American Academy of Arts & Sciences, and over the span of his career he served on many governing boards, including as chairman of the Texas Super Conducting Super Collider Project. In 2021, he was inducted into the Texas Business Hall of Fame.

== Personal life and death ==
In 1964, Meyerson married Marlene Nathan; they had two children. The couple divorced before subsequently reconciling and remarrying, and were together until her death in 2017.

Meyerson died from metastatic prostate cancer at his home in Dallas on August 5, 2025, at the age of 87.
