= Marry Me Chicken =

Skillet chicken recipe

Marry Me Chicken is a skillet chicken recipe popularized by social media.

It is a creamy casserole of chicken breast with herbs, garlic, sun-dried tomatoes, and parmesan cheese.

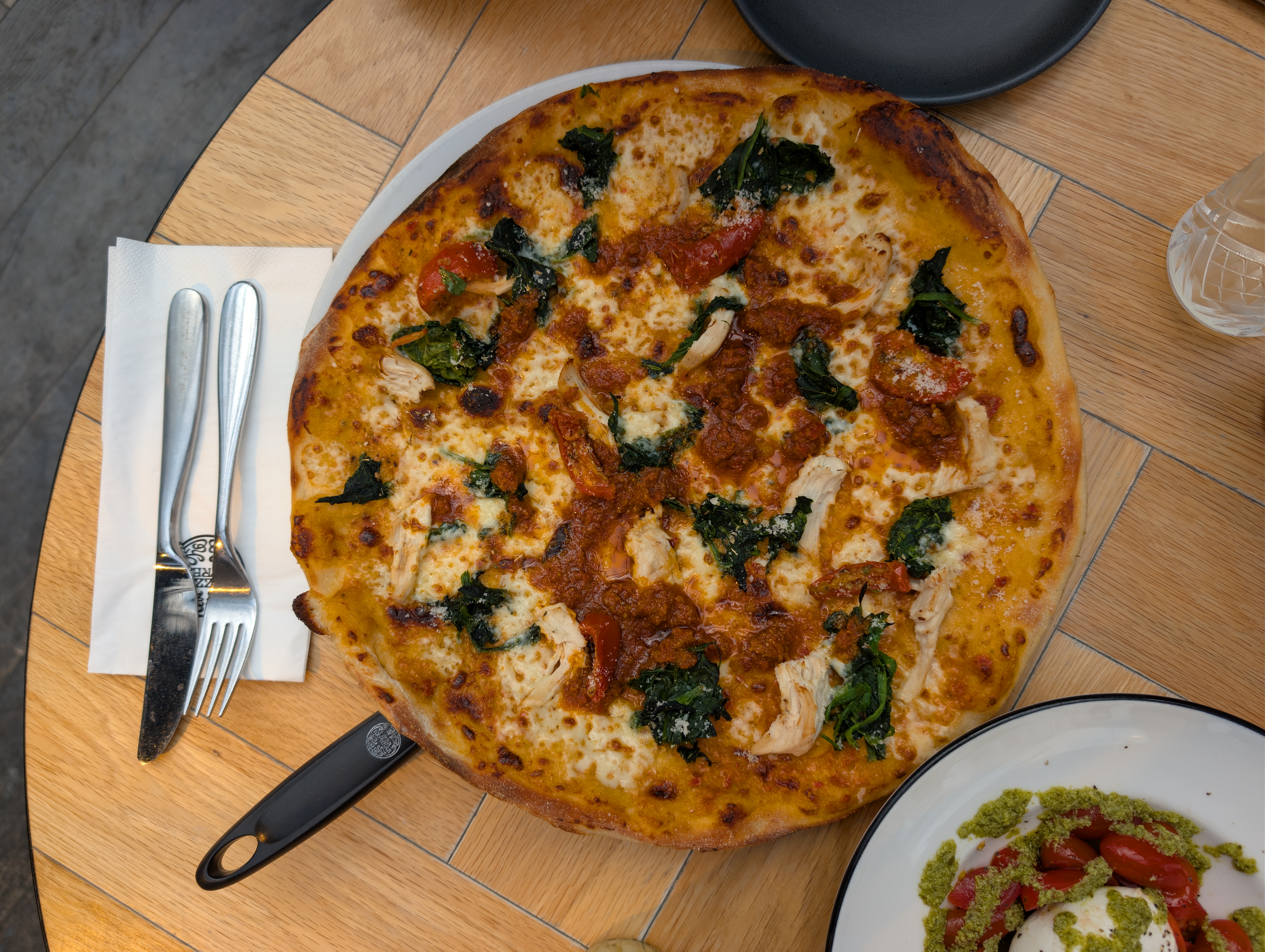
A pizza adaptation of "Marry Me" Chicken

A vegan version by BOSH! chefs uses butter beans to replace the chicken.

== See also ==
- Engagement chicken
