= Nemotek Technologie =

Moroccan high-tech manufacturing company

- Type: Private
- Industry: Semiconductor
- Founded: 2008
- Headquarters: Morocco
- Key people: CEO: José da Costa Gatta
- Products: Wafer-level Packaging (WLP) Wafer-level optics (WLO) Wafer-level cameras (WLC)

Nemotek Technologie is a Moroccan manufacturing company based in the Rabat Technopolis Park in Morocco, founded in May 2008.

Nemotek Technologie, funded by Caisse de dépôt et de gestion (CDG), manufactures customized wafer-level cameras for portable applications. It provides customized design and manufacturing services of wafer-level packaging, wafer-level optics and wafer-level cameras.

== History ==
In July 2009, Nemotek Technologie announced a new WLP technology, which provides a true chip-scale package with a minimum thickness of 400om. The die size is 0.6mm, which fitting up to a maximum of 40,000 dies per wafer. This solution is based on advanced WLP technology and delivered based on Through Silicon Via (TSV) technology. It provides thin, reliable, and sophisticated imaging components for applications such as mobile camera phones, mobile computers, and other mobile devices used in medical or automotive applications. In October 2009, Nemotek announced the availability of its miniaturized Wafer-Level Camera (WLC) for portable applications.

The company announced the development of a two-element VGA lens which was exhibited at the 2010 Mobile World Congress in Barcelona, Spain. A two-element lens is made when two optical wafers are processed and bonded together.

Most recently, Nemotek announced a one-element wider field of view lens for portable applications. The lens provides a field of view up to 65 degrees; other, similar lenses are typically limited to 60 degrees. The announcement attracted significant attention in the mobile camera market. The lens was advertised as further narrowing the gap with standalone digital cameras. The development is considered a milestone for Nemotek.

== See also ==
- Science and technology in Morocco
