= Engagement chicken =

American dish rumored to lead to marriage

Engagement chicken is an American lemon- and herb-flavored roast chicken dish, purported to cause boyfriends to propose marriage. The recipe was created in 1982 among the staff of Glamour magazine.

== Origin ==
The recipe was developed by Kim Bonnell, a fashion editor at Glamour magazine, following a trip to Italy. In 1982, Bonnell gave the recipe to co-worker Kathy Suder to prepare for her boyfriend; the couple was engaged shortly thereafter. The recipe made the rounds in the office, and three other women in the office were offered marriage proposals soon after making the dish for their boyfriends.

In 2003, after Glamour editor-in-chief Cindi Leive heard that wedding proposals followed making the recipe, she dubbed the recipe "Engagement Chicken" and ran the recipe in the magazine in December 2003. Soon afterwards the magazine began receiving letters from women claiming that their boyfriends proposed shortly after being served the dish. The magazine claims 70 couples have married after the women served their boyfriends the dish.

== In the media ==
The month the recipe appeared in Glamour, Beth Ostrosky fixed the dish for her boyfriend, shock jock Howard Stern. The next day Stern, who had sworn off marrying again, described the dish on air to the amusement of his co-hosts, who claimed that the "trap had been set". One of the show's audience members called in and said the dish he described appeared in a recent edition of Glamour and told him the name of the dish and how it got its name. Stern called Ostrosky on air. Ostrosky claimed that she wanted to fix the dish because it looked delicious and appeared very simple to prepare, but she also told how romantic Stern became while eating the dinner. Two years later, Stern and Ostrosky became engaged.

The recipe has also been featured on the Today Show, Martha, Barefoot Contessa, and Good Morning America.

== See also ==
- Marry Me Chicken
- List of chicken dishes
