= Quincy Armstrong =

American gridiron football player (1928–2020)

No. 45, 54
- Position: Center

Personal information
- Born: November 22, 1928; Clyde, Texas, U.S.
- Died: November 2, 2020 (aged 91)
- Listed height: 6 ft 3 in (1.91 m)
- Listed weight: 230 lb (104 kg)

Career information
- High school: R. L. Paschal (Fort Worth, Texas)
- College: North Texas State (1948–1951)
- NFL draft: 1951: 26th round, 314th overall pick

Career history
- Hamilton Tiger-Cats (1952–1953); Cleveland Browns (1954); Ottawa Rough Riders (1955)

Awards and highlights
- NFL champion (1954); Grey Cup champion (1953)

Career NFL statistics
- Games played: 2
- Games started: 1
- Stats at Pro Football Reference

Carl Quince "Quincy" Armstrong Jr. (November 22, 1928 – November 2, 2020) was an American professional football center who played for the Cleveland Browns in 1954. He was born in Clyde, Texas. Armstrong began his professional football career in Canada with the Hamilton Tiger-Cats. He played for two seasons and won a Grey Cup championship in 1953. He finished his football days with the Ottawa Rough Riders in 1955.
