= Charlie Mary Noble =

Teacher in astronomy and mathematics

Charlie Mary Noble (October 31, 1877 – November 30, 1959) was a teacher in astronomy and mathematics education in Fort Worth, Texas. She founded many clubs, notably the Fort Worth Astronomical Society, which was one of the first amateur astronomy clubs in the United States. She contributed several generations of planetarium systems for the Fort Worth Children's Museum, which later became the Fort Worth Museum of Science and History. The planetarium at the museum was named after Noble, the first woman in the United States to be so honored.

== Early life ==
Charlie Mary Noble was born in Giddings, Texas on October 31, 1877, to Sallie Mellette Noble and Stephen W. Noble. In 1888, she and her family moved to Fort Worth from Hearne, Texas.

== Education ==
She graduated from Old Fort Worth High School. She attended Warren Institute in Fort Worth and Sam Houston State College in Huntsville, Texas. She received a B.S. from the University of Texas, and a B.S. and M.S. from Texas Christian University (TCU).

== Teaching career ==
=== Fort Worth Public Schools ===
Starting in 1897, Noble taught mathematics at Paschal High School, in the Fort Worth public school system. In 1918, she was promoted to the head of the mathematics department, where she served for twenty-five more years. In 1926, she started the Penta Club, an honors mathematics society, which was one of the first science clubs for students in Fort Worth. In 1943, she retired after 46 years of teaching at Paschal High School but continued to teach.

=== Texas Christian University ===
Charlie Noble used astronomy in her mathematics instruction at Paschal High School and was asked to teach mathematics, astronomy, and celestial navigation at Texas Christian University (TCU) as part of the US Navy's V-12 officer training program during World War II. After the war, she continued to teach astronomy at TCU.

== Career after teaching ==
=== Fort Worth Children's Museum and the Fort Worth Museum of Science and History ===
Noble created the first planetarium in Fort Worth in the mid-1940s in a tent 18-foot in diameter, providing the first planetarium experience in north Texas. In 1947 Noble founded the Junior Astronomy Club of the Fort Worth Children's Museum and purchased one of the first mechanical planetariums available, a Spitz star-ball Model A, which had just been developed a year earlier by Armand Spitz. The Spitz star ball was presented to the Fort Worth Children's Museum, which at that time had just relocated from the De Zavala Elementary School to its location in the R.E. Harding House at 1306 Summit, south of downtown Fort Worth.

Two years later, Noble constructed of a more permanent tent as a planetarium, still on Summit Street. In 1954, the museum moved into a new building on Montgomery Avenue and the in 1955 a new Spitz A-1 was purchased and installed into a planetarium attached to the new building. The planetarium was installed in a structure that included a 30-foot plaster dome, rather than a tent. The Fort Worth Children's Museum honored Noble by naming the Noble Planetarium was named after her. This was the first planetarium in the world to be named after a woman. In 1968 the Fort Worth Children's Museum changed its name to the Fort Worth Museum of Science and History. In 2008, the museum tore down the old building that it had used from 1954 and constructed a new building, designed by architects Legorreta and Legorreta. The Museum reopened in 2009 and housed a modern planetarium in a bigger 40-foot dome and hybrid projection system created by Zeiss. The name of the new planetarium continued honor Noble.

In 1957 and 1958 Noble organized and ran the Moonwatch program for Fort Worth. The Moonwatch program was organized by meteor expert, Fred Whipple of the Smithsonian Astrophysical Observatory (SAO) to track satellites before dedicated systems became available in 1958. Moon-watchers, who were all members of her Junior Astronomy Club at the Museum, tracked the positions of Sputnik and other satellites that allowed scientists to determine their precise orbits. The Fort Worth Moonwatch team was recognized for its work by the Smithsonian Astrophysical Observatory.

=== Fort Worth Astronomical Society ===
In 1947, the Junior Astronomy Club was an amateur astronomy club created for children by Noble. Two years later in 1949, Noble founded the Fort Worth Astronomical Society. This was one of the first adult amateur astronomical clubs in the country and met weekly.

=== Texas Sky ===
A popular guide to local astronomy has been a long-time wish of Charlie Noble, who worked with her friend Henry M. Neely, a lecturer at the American Museum-Hayden Planetarium in New York to create The Texas Sky. The Texas Sky is a monthly summary of astronomical events written especially for Texas amateur observers, which premiered two months before her death.

== Awards ==
- Paschal High School Hall of Honor.
- 1946: "Educators as Pathfinder" tribute from Delta Kappa Gamma society.
- 1950: Honorary doctorate degree from Texas Christian University for her wartime teaching activities and her outstanding work in astronomy.
- 1954: First Lady of Altrusa Club for unselfish devotion to the interests of young people.
- 1956: Astronomical League award for outstanding work in astronomy. She was the first woman to receive this award.
- 1958: Honorary Member Delta Kappa Gamma society, recognizing women who have made notable contributions to education and women.

== Death and legacy ==
Charlie Mary Noble died November 30, 1959, and was buried along with her parents in the Greenwood Cemetery.
