= Kathy Suder =

American photographer and painter

- Born: Kathy Sherman; Fort Worth, Texas, U.S.
- Education: Paschal High School; Tulane University
- Known for: Photography and painting
- Website: kathysuder.com

Kathy Suder is an American artist known for her large-scale color boxing photographs and paintings. She is also an arts volunteer in Fort Worth, focusing on programs benefitting children.

== Early life ==
One of three daughters, Suder was born to Scott and Selma Sherman in Fort Worth. Her father was a five-time Golden Gloves champion from 1949 to 1954, boxing manager, and auto parts entrepreneur. Suder credits her artistic interest in boxing to her exposure to the sport while growing up in Fort Worth. At seven, she trained as the only female in Fort Worth's Panther Boys Club boxing team. Around this time, she started showing an aptitude for art. While attending Paschal High School, she served as Fort Worth United High School representative and basketball statistician.

During her time at Tulane University, she worked as a student editor for Mademoiselle. She moved to New York after graduation and worked as an associate fashion editor for Glamour. She frequented art museums, which inspired her to start painting. She was also a student at the George Washington University Law School.

After marrying Jon Suder in 1982, the two moved to Washington, D.C., while her husband finished law school. She routinely painted plein air while living there. After graduation, they moved to Fort Worth and started a family.

== Art career ==
Around 1994 in Fort Worth, Suder started painting in oils while also studying art at Texas Christian University and attending art workshops. She also took some of her earliest boxing pictures at this time of Paulie Ayala, whom her father managed. Inspired by a high chair she designed, Suder started a children's hand-painted furniture business, FUN-iture, which she closed in 1997. Afterwards, she started working on oil painting, but abandoned her early motifs of landscapes and still lifes.

In 1995, Suder began to suffer from migraines. While working at the Anderson Art Center in Snowmass, Colorado, she rediscovered one of her boxing photographs, which became the inspiration for her first boxing painting. The painting, Get Up!, also served as an embodiment of the painful migraines.

After returning to Fort Worth, she worked in a studio offered by a friend, Bill Bostleman, and found a supportive group of artist friends, including Nancy Lamb and Dan Blagg. In 2000, while at the Anderson Art Center, she met photographer Eikoh Hosoe, who encouraged her to focus on photography.

The New Yorker, commenting on an exhibition at Bruce Silverstein Gallery in 2004, stated that her boxing photographs "owe more to Caravaggio than to Sports Illustrated." An ARTnews review observed that "they hint at the artist's history as a painter ..." They also have been likened to boxing paintings by George Bellows, and their attention to chiaroscuro connects them to Renaissance art. Beyond their visceral quality, they suggest the human condition. Commenting on the relationship between her boxing paintings and photographs, Andrew Marton for Fort Worth Star-Telegram observed, "These highly affecting photos, freezing the ring's ritualistic choreography, serve as Suder's essential sketching in preparation for her boxing paintings. The stylistic bridge between Suder's photos and paintings is in the blurred representations of the boxers' bodies, impressionistic masses of flesh with roughly drawn appendages attached to blots of color symbolizing boxing gloves."

Suder spent six years working on a series of subway photographs taken in London, Tokyo, and New York that offer similar intimacy and immediacy as her boxing photographs. She was also interested in capturing the democratizing environment of subways. In a related publication, curator John Rohrbach recognized that Suder, "[delivers] a mix of classes, races, ages, and cultures as the trains pass from one neighborhood to the next ... her subway is a community, even when it exudes feigned solitude."

== Other ==
In 1982, while Suder was working in New York at Glamour, a coworker shared a chicken recipe with her. After serving it to her boyfriend, the two were engaged soon after. Several other coworkers also got engagement proposals after serving the dish to their boyfriends. Engagement chicken earned its name when the recipe appeared in the January 2004 issue of the magazine.

== Selected solo exhibitions ==
- First solo exhibition (Randall's Gourmet Cheesecake Co., [date])
- Knockout! (Westbank Landing, 1999, nine paintings and thirteen boxing photographs)
- Kathy Suder: Knockout! (Bruce Silverstein Gallery, February 15 – March 13, 2004)
- Paris Suite and Knockout (William Campbell Contemporary Art, 2004)
- Underground: Photographs by Kathy Sherman Suder (Amon Carter Museum of American Art, March 15 – August 17, 2014)

== Museum collections ==
- Amon Carter Museum of American Art
- Los Angeles County Museum of Art
