= Fourteen Hills =

American literary magazine

- Categories: Poetry, Fiction, Essays, Art, Interviews
- Frequency: Biannually (print)
- Publisher: San Francisco State University
- First issue: 1994; 31 years ago
- Based in: San Francisco, California, United States
- Language: English
- Website: http://14hills.net/

Fourteen Hills is the San Francisco State University literary magazine associated with the MFA degree program. Founded in 1994, it publishes poetry, fiction, short plays, and literary nonfiction. The semiannual journal includes experimental and progressive work by emerging and cross-genre writers, as well as by award-winning and established authors.

== History ==
Fourteen Hills publishes one issue every year of the Fourteen Hills: the SFSU review, as well as the manuscript of the annual winner of the Michael Rubin Book Award.

Fourteen Hills Vol. 6, No. 1 sold out within a few months, and Kate Small's award-winning chapbook, also published by Fourteen Hills, is now in its second printing. Pieces first published in Fourteen Hills have won the following literary awards:

- 2020 Best American Short Stories: Anna Reeser's "Octopus VII"
- 2019 Nicolás Guillén Outstanding Book Award from the Caribbean Philosophical Association: Phillip Barron's What Comes from a Thing.
- 2009 Best New Poets Anthology: Joshua Robbins' "The Man in Hooper's Office in a Small City"
- 2006 Pushcart Prize Special Mention: Eugene Martin's excerpt of "Waste"
- 2000 Flannery O'Connor Award for Fiction: Bill Roorbach's "Thanksgiving"
- 1998 O'Henry Prize Anthology: Peter Weltner's "Movietone: Detour"
- 100 Distinguished Stories of 1997: Sonia Gernes' "Ye Watchers"
- 1997 Best American Gay Fiction Prize Anthology: Stephen Beachy's "Shapes"
- 1997 O'Henry Prize Anthology: Mary Gaitskill's "Comfort"
- 1997 Best American Gay Fiction Prize Anthology: Kolin Ohi's "A Backward Glance"
- 1996 Best American Poetry Prize Anthology: Alice Notley's "The Longest Times"

== Events ==
Fourteen Hills also hosts a number of literary events each year. The most awaited is the Fourteen Hills release party. Authors who have appeared at the events have included Stephen Elliott, Peter Orner, Nona Caspers, Eireene Nealand and John Cleary.

Fourteen Hills and SFSU administer the Stacy Doris Memorial Poetry Award, named after late writing professor Stacy Doris. The prize, which was first awarded in 2014, awards the winning poet with a $500 prize and publication in the Spring issue of Fourteen Hills.

== See also ==
- List of literary magazines
