= Betsy Colquitt =

American writer

Elizabeth "Betsy" Colquitt (1926 – 7 April 2009) was an American professor of English and a poet known for themes and poetic structures which reflect a modernist sensibility. She was born in Fort Worth, Texas, United States in 1926 and died on 7 April 2009.

== Background ==
Colquitt's poems, essays, and reviews have been widely published in major American literary journals for forty years. Colquitt, née Betsy Ruth Feagan, was born in Fort Worth, Texas where she attended Paschal High School and graduated with honors with a degree in English from Texas Christian University in 1947. She attended Vanderbilt University and studied creative writing in a graduate program that included Allen Tate and John Crowe Ransom who served as Colquitt's professors and mentors. James Dickey was a classmate. Colquitt received her M.A. degree from Vanderbilt in 1948. She attended the University of Wisconsin–Madison to work on her Ph.D. but left the program in 1953 to return to Fort Worth because her mother had suffered a stroke. Colquitt joined the faculty of the English department at Texas Christian University in 1953 where she taught literature and creative writing until her retirement in 1995. A course she developed on the "Interrelation of the Arts" became a mainstay of the program and a much beloved and influential course among her students. At TCU, she also became the founding editor of the literary journal Descant, which she edited for twenty-five years. The major poetry award offered by Descant is named in her honor.

While at TCU, Colquitt met and married Landon Colquitt, a mathematics professor to whom she was married until his death from a heart attack in 1991. The Colquitts had two daughters, Kate, a physician, and Clare, a professor at San Diego State University.

Colquitt's volumes of poetry include Honor Card and Other Poems (Saurian Press, 1980) and Eve: From the Autobiography and Other Poems (Texas Christian University Press, 1997). Eve has been praised for its feminist analyses of creativity and of woman's role in the creation, and this volume together with many of Colquitt's other poems and essays, have led many critics to view Colquitt as a leading woman writer. Critics also praise Colquitt's work for its insights into cognition and creativity and for its sensitivity to the longings of the human heart for an identity rooted in meaning and purpose. James Ward Lee wrote: "Betsy Colquitt has long been recognized as one of Texas’ finest poets."

Information on and analyses of Colquitt's works are included in Contemporary Authors, Who's Who of American Women, Directory of American Scholars, and World's Who's Who of Women. She also held memberships in the Texas Institute of Letters and in the American Center for Artists.
