= Higher Council for Education, Training and Scientific Research =

- Abbreviation: CSEFRS
- Formation: 2014; 12 years ago
- Headquarters: Rabat, Morocco
- President: Rahma Bourqia
- Website: csefrs.ma

The Higher Council for Education, Training and Scientific Research (Conseil supérieur de l'éducation, de la formation et de la recherche scientifique, CSEFRS) is an independent consultative body in Morocco, responsible for issuing opinions and recommendations on public policies in the fields of education, training, and scientific research.

It brings together various stakeholders, including experts, representatives of the government and parliament, trade unions, as well as members of civil society. Since March 2025, it has been chaired by Rahma Bourqia, appointed by King Mohammed VI.

== History ==
The Higher Council for Education, Training and Scientific Research was established by Law No. 105.12, adopted by the Parliament of Morocco in May 2014. It was formally set up in July 2014, with the appointment of its 92 members.

In May 2015, the Council published its analytical report entitled “The Implementation of the National Charter for Education and Training (2000–2013)”.

As part of its institutional functioning, Aziz Kaichouh was appointed Secretary-General in May 2023, succeeding Iman Kerkeb.

In March 2025, Rahma Bourqia was appointed President of the Council, succeeding Habib El Malki.

== Roles ==
=== Advisory Role ===
The Council issues opinions and provides advice on public policies in the fields of education, training, and scientific research in Morocco.

=== Evaluation of Public Policies ===
It contributes to the evaluation of public policies and programs implemented in these fields, notably through the National Evaluation Authority.

=== Support for Reforms ===
The CSEFRS supports the relevant sectors in implementing reforms and monitoring the objective of establishing a “new Moroccan school.”

=== Preparation of Reports and Recommendations ===
It produces reports, forward-looking studies, opinions, and strategic recommendations to guide the transformation of Morocco's education system.

=== Strategic Forum ===
The Council serves as a space for discussion and coordination on various issues related to education, training, and scientific research.
