= Fishing industry in Morocco =

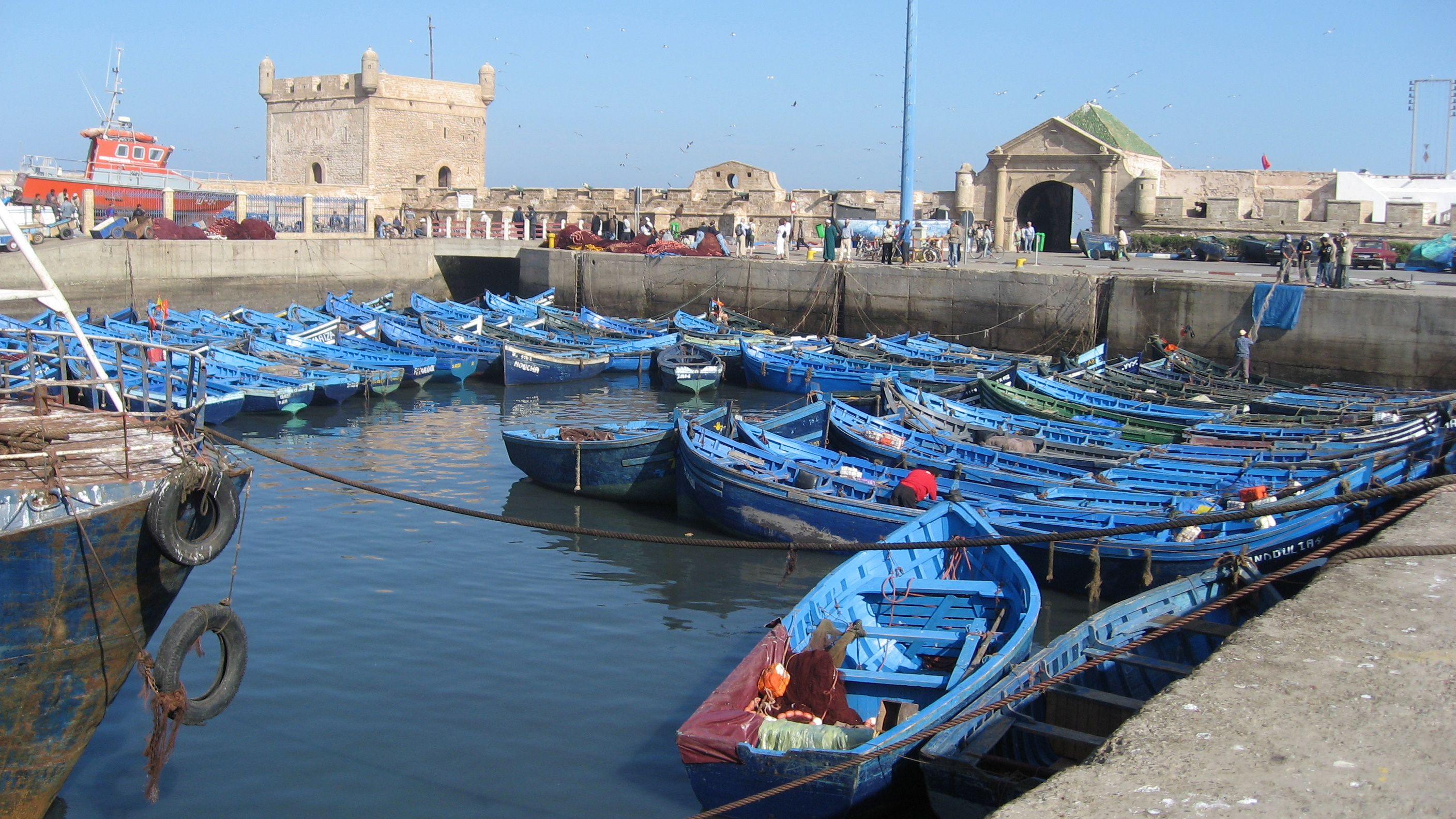
Fishing boats in Essaouira

The fishing industry in Morocco is a leading foreign exchange earner, accounting for 2,84% of total exports. For a long time the industry has been an economic pillar for the country. The kingdom is considered the largest fish market in Africa, with an estimated total catch of 1,084,638 MT in 2001.

== Fisheries sector ==
The fisheries sector accounts for 3% of Morocco's GDP. The government estimates the number of direct and indirect jobs at 400,000 (including 104,000 fishermen). The small-scale fisheries sector (100,000 people) lags far behind other branches of the fishing industry owing to the lack of infrastructure and of harbour facilities and plant.

The fishing grounds in the Canary Current off Morocco's west coast are exceptionally rich in sardines, bonito, and tuna, but the country lacks the modern fleets and processing facilities to benefit fully from these marine resources. An important part of a major trade agreement Morocco concluded with the European Union in 1996 concerned fishing rights, by which the EU pays Morocco an annual fee to allow vessels (mainly Spanish) to fish Moroccan waters. A new four-year fishery agreement with the European Union will allow European vessels, mostly from Spain, to operate in Moroccan and Western Saharan waters in exchange for an economic compensation programme, which the National Fishery Office of Morocco intends to use to boost modernisation of its domestic fishery sector.

== Reform ==
Morocco's wide-reaching agricultural reform drive has been extended to the fishing industry. At the end of September 2009, the Ministry of Agriculture, Rural Development and Maritime Fishing unveiled Plan Halieutis. Which aims to increase exports from DH8.3bn (€729m) in 2007 to DH21.9bn (€1.9bn) by 2020. In the same time period, the sector's contribution to GDP is expected to rise from DH16.2bn to DH23.9bn (€2bn). Direct jobs in the fishing industry, a key employer, are also anticipated to nearly double, rising from 61,650 to 115,000.

== Disputes ==
There have been constant disputes with Spain over fishing rights since 1973 when Morocco declared an Exclusive Economic Zone (EEZ), resulting in a 70-nautical-mile (130 km) coastal fishing limit. This was extended to 200 nautical miles (370 km) in 1981. In February 2012 it was reported that the Spanish Prime Minister was urging Morocco to negotiate an agreement about these differences.

== Gallery ==
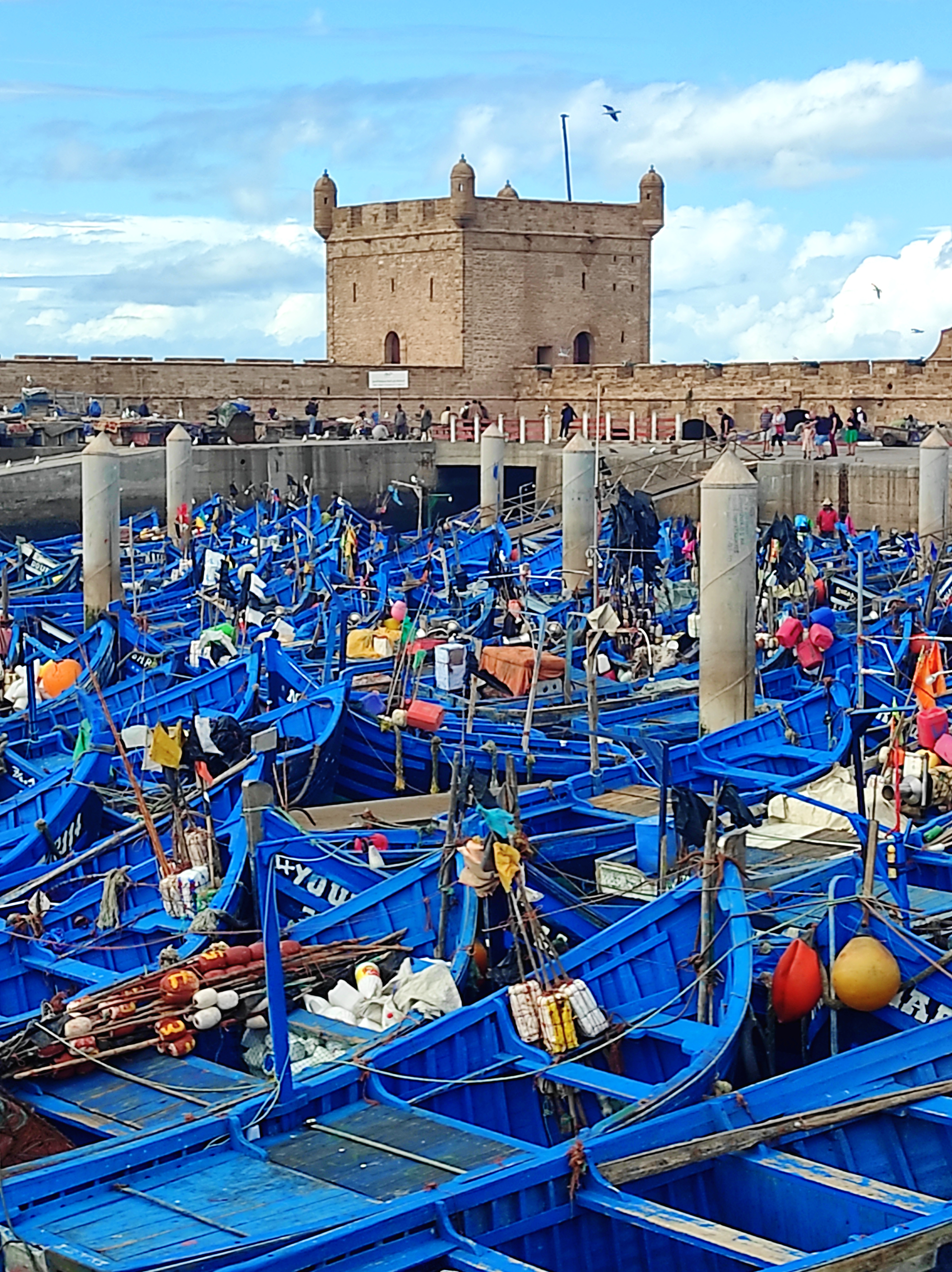
Fishing Boats in Essaouira Harbor

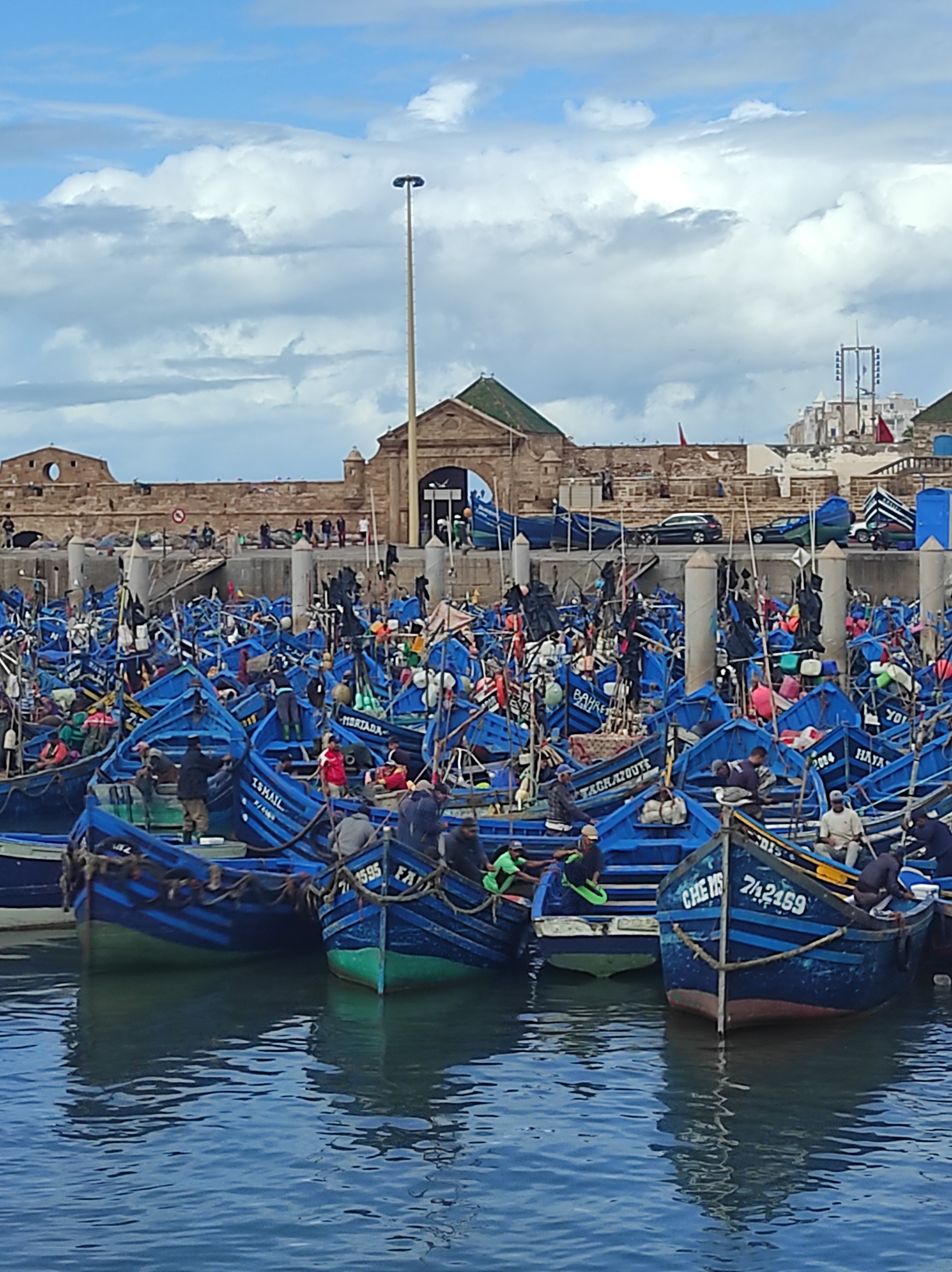
Fishing Port of Essaouira
