= Regional Center for Renewable Energy and Energy Efficiency =

Egyptian-based governmental organization

- Abbreviation: RCREEE
- Formation: 2008
- Type: Regional Nonprofit organization
- Legal status: Independent international organization
- Location: Cairo, Egypt
- Staff: 25
- Website: www.rcreee.org

The Regional Center for Renewable Energy and Energy Efficiency (RCREEE) is an intergovernmental organization with diplomatic status that aims to enable and increase the adoption of renewable energy and energy efficiency practices in the Arab region. RCREEE teams with regional governments and global organizations to initiate and lead clean energy policy dialogues, strategies, technologies and capacity development in order to increase Arab states' share of tomorrow's energy.

Through its solid alliance with the League of Arab States, RCREEE is committed to tackle each country's specific needs and objectives through collaborating with Arab policy makers, businesses, international organizations and academic communities in key work areas: capacity development and learning, policies and regulations, research and statistics, and technical assistance. The center is also involved in various local and regional projects and initiatives that are tailored to specific objectives.

Having today 17 Arab countries among its members (Algeria, Bahrain, Djibouti, Egypt, Iraq, Jordan, Kuwait, Lebanon, Libya, Mauritania Morocco, Palestine, Somalia Sudan, Syria, Tunisia, and Yemen), RCREEE strives to lead renewable energy and energy efficiency initiatives and expertise in all Arab states based on five core strategic impact areas: facts and figures, policies, people, institutions, and finance.

RCREEE is financed through its member state contributions, government grants provided by Germany through the German Development Cooperation (GIZ) GmbH (link), Denmark through the Danish International Development Agency (DANIDA) (link), and Egypt through the New and Renewable Energy Authority (NREA) (link). RCREEE is also financed through selected fee-for-service contracts.

History

RCREEE was set up based on Cairo Declaration which was signed in June, 2008 by government representatives from ten Arab countries. The declaration outlined the following two core objectives for establishing the center:

1. To diffuse the implementation of cost-effective renewable energy and energy efficiency policies, strategies and technologies in the Arab region.
2. To increase the share of renewable energy and energy efficiency products and services in the Arab region and their share of global market.

RCREEE acquired its legal status in August, 2010 as an independent not-for-profit international organization through a Host Country Agreement with the government of Egypt.

Member Countries	Local Partners
Algeria	Ministère de l'Energie et des Mines
Bahrain	Electricity and Water Authority
Djibouti	Ministry of Energy and Mineral Resources
Egypt	Ministry of Electricity and Renewable Energy
Iraq	Renewable Energy and Environment Center - Ministry of Electricity
Jordan	Ministry of Energy and Mineral Resources
Kuwait	Ministry of Electricity and Water
Lebanon	Lebanese Center for Energy Conservation
Libya	Renewable Energy Authority of Libya (REAOL)
Mauritania	Ministry of Electricity and Renewable Energies
Morocco	Centre d'information sur l'Energy Durable et l'Environement (CIEDE)
Palestinian Authority	The Palestinian Energy and Environment Research Center
Somalia	Ministry of Energy and Water Resources
Sudan	Ministry of Water Resources and Electricity
Syria	National Energy Research Center
Tunisia	Ministere de l'Industrie, de l'Energie et des Petites et Moyennes Entreprises
Yemen	Ministry of Electricity and Energy

== Center Bodies ==
a. Board of Trustees

RCREEE is governed by a Board of Trustees (BoT) which is responsible for setting the center's strategic direction, approving annual work plans, and evaluating performance. The board consists of governmental representatives from member states. Members of the Board of the Trustees

b. Executive Committee

In addition, the Board of Trustees has elected the RCREEE Executive Committee. The Executive Committee consists of five members from the governmental and private sectors. Its role is to oversea the implementation of the strategic direction approved by the BoT, oversee and advise the Secretariat in the center's management.

Members of the executive committee

c. National Focal Points

The national focal points assist the Secretariat with the implementation of the work plan at the national level.

National Focal Points

== Partners Network ==
RCREEE is a partner with regional and international bodies focused on international development, sustainable energy, and environmental cooperation. These include the World Bank, (link), United Nations Development Programme (UNDP) (link), United Nations Industrial Development Organization (UNIDO)(link), United Nations Environment Program (UNEP) (link), United Nations Economic and Social Commission for Western Asia (UN-ESCWA) (link), League of Arab States (link), International Renewable Energy Agency (IRENA) (link), and Renewable Energy Solutions for Mediterranean (RES4MED) (link).
