= Stacy Doris =

American poet

Stacy Doris (May 21, 1962 – January 31, 2012) was a poet who wrote in English and French. Doris used the name "Madame Wiener" or «Sa Femme» in some of her French work.

== Life and work ==
In article about Stacy Doris by the Poetry Foundation, The Foundation noted Doris' “ferocity of living and invention." As a teacher, each semester she would offer deep, exploratory seminars in different topics. For Doris, writing, learning, living and romancing were all in the service of one another.

Doris was influential in bridging the worlds of French and American poetry through her own fictions, as well as in the anthologies she edited. Some examples include The Violence of the White Page (Tyuonyi, 1991), with Emmanuel Hocquard, Twenty-two New (to North America) French Poets (Raddle Moon, 1997), with Norma Cole, and from French to English, Quelques-uns de mes contemporains: New American Writers (Java 2001).

Doris was an associate professor of creative writing at San Francisco State University, where a poetry award has been created in her honour. Her last published works were Fledge: A Phenomenology of Spirit (Nightboat Books, 2013), which she completed shortly before her death, and The Cake Part (Publication Studio, 2011) of which some 50 poets, film-makers and other artists contributed to making short films for the launch (see Cake Part Virtual Launch).

== Bibliography ==
=== Books ===
- Fledge: a Phenomenology of Spirit (Night-boat Books, Callicoon, NY, 2012)
- The Cake Part (Portland, OR: Publication Studio) 2011.
- Paramour trans. Anne Portugal and Caroline Dubois (Paris: P.O.L) 2009.
- Knot (Athens, GA: University of Georgia Press) 2006. Winner of the University of Georgia Contemporary Poetry Series Award.
- Parlement (Paris: P.O.L) 2005.
- Cheerleader’s Guide to the World : Council Book (NY: Roof) 2006.
- Conference (Bedford MA: Potes & Poets) 2001.
- Une Année à New York avec Chester (Paris: P.O.L) 2000.
- Paramour (San Francisco: Krupskaya) 2000.
- La Vie de Chester Steven Wiener écrite par sa femme (Paris: P.O.L) 1998.
- Comment Aimer, trans. Anne Portugal and Caroline Dubois of Paramour excerpts (Grâne, France: Créaphis) 1998.
- Kildare (NY: Roof) 1995. Reprint at Kildare EPC

=== Audio compositions ===
- Parlement (l'Atelier de Création Radiophonique, France Culture Radio, director Jean Couturier) Original broadcast November 13, 2005. Rebroadcast at ACR, FranceCulture

=== Chapbooks ===
- Le temps est à chacun, trans. Martin Richet from Knot (Marseille: Contrat Main) 2002.
- Kildare, trans. Juliette Valery (Bordeaux: Format Américain) 1995.
- Implements for Use (St. Denis: A. Slacik) 1995.
- Mop Factory Incident (NY: Women's Studio) 1995. Reprint at: Mop Factory Incident WSW

=== Anthologies and collections ===
- Editor, "Quelques-uns de mes contemporains: New American Writers," (Paris: Java) 2001.
- Co-editor (with Chet Wiener), Christophe Tarkos: Ma Langue est Poétique--Selected Work (New York: Roof) 2001.
- Editor, "Recent French Poetics" in Poetry on the Edge; a Symposium (Durham, NC: Duke University) 1999.
- Co-editor (with Norma Cole), Twenty-two New (to North America) French Poets (Vancouver: Raddle Moon) 1997.
- Co-editor (with Emmanuel Hocquard), Violence of the White Page, Contemporary French Poetry in Translation (Santa Fe, NM: Pederal) 1992. Reprint at ViolenceWhitePage Duration
