= Electronic Data Systems =

American information technology company

HP Enterprise Services LLC

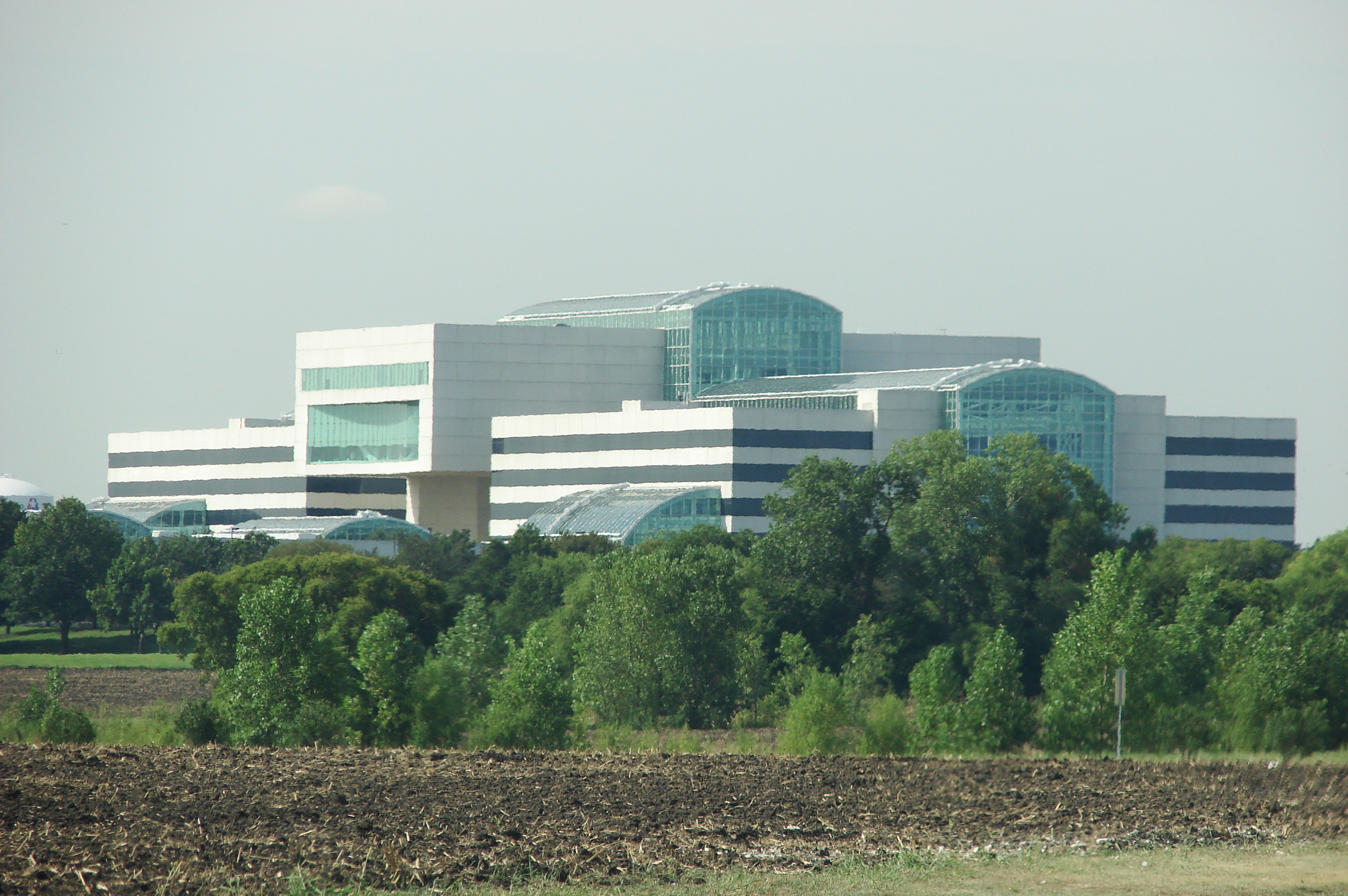
- EDS headquarters in Plano, Texas prior to its implosion on August 9, 2026
- Formerly: Electronic Data Systems Corporation (1962-2008); Electronic Data Systems LLC (2008-2009)
- Type: Subsidiary
- Traded as: NYSE: EDS
- ISIN: US2856611049
- Industry: Information technology
- Founded: June 27, 1962; 64 years ago
- Founder: Ross Perot
- Defunct: April 3, 2017
- Fate: Merged with Computer Sciences Corporation into DXC Technology
- Successor: DXC Technology
- Headquarters: Plano, Texas, USA
- Area served: Worldwide
- Products: IT services
- Revenue: US$22.1 billion (2007)
- Number of employees: 136,000
- Parent: General Motors (1984-1996); Hewlett-Packard (2008-2015); Hewlett Packard Enterprise (2015-present)
- Website: www.eds.com

HP Enterprise Services LLC (formerly Electronic Data Systems Corporation, then Electronic Data Systems LLC) was an American multinational information technology equipment and services company headquartered in Plano, Texas.

Founded in 1962 by Ross Perot, EDS was a subsidiary of GM from 1984 until it was spun off in 1996. The company was acquired by Hewlett-Packard (HP) in 2008 and rebranded as HPES in 2009.

In 2017, the company merged with Computer Sciences Corporation into DXC Technology.

== History ==
Former EDS logo (2003-2009)

Electronic Data Systems (EDS) was founded in 1962 by H. Ross Perot, a graduate of the United States Naval Academy and a successful IBM salesman, who made first-hand observations of how inefficiently IBM's customers typically were using their expensive systems. Somewhat to IBM's chagrin, since the company wanted to sell as many computers as possible, Perot made a fortune changing this. An early success was in matching the unused computer time at Southwestern Life Insurance Company with the computing needs of rapidly expanding Collins Radio, both located in Dallas, Texas. Perot knew the inside details of both companies.

In its early years, EDS was a pioneer in facilities management – becoming the IT department for many companies – as well as beginning to service banks and provide early support for both Medicaid and Medicare in its home state of Texas. Leading the effort internally was Morton H. Meyerson, who joined the company in 1966 as the company's 54th employee. In 1967, he proposed the business model that eventually became known as "outsourcing" and which led to exponential growth for EDS.

In the 1970s, EDS expanded initially into more insurance services and later credit unions, and by 1975, revenue topped $100 million (~$464 million in 2025) and the company began bidding for work internationally. In 1978, EDS expanded into financial markets with the arrival of automated teller machines, electronic funds transfer, and real-time point-of-sale terminals. Meyerson was named president in 1979, when EDS had revenue of $270 million (about $965 million in 2025), was free of debt, and had 8,000 employees.

In the 1980s, the company expanded into travel services supporting payment services between travel agents and airlines represented by the Air Transport Association of America and provided large-scale contracts for the US military.

In January 1981, EDS purchased Centurion Computer Corporation, founded as Warrex Computer Corporation in 1972, a manufacturer of small-business minicomputers.

=== General Motors acquisition ===
In 1984, the company was acquired by General Motors (GM) for $2.6 billion (about $6.55 billion in 2025), with EDS becoming a wholly owned subsidiary of GM. Meyerson remained president, and in 1985, the company had a presence in 21 countries with 40,000 employees. Meyerson retired in 1987. During his years of executive leadership, EDS revenue grew to $4 billion a year, and the company grew to 45,000 employees. By the end of the decade, revenue was $5 billion.

In 1985, EDS began moving into its new headquarters in the Legacy development in Plano, Texas, with the campus opening in stages and the main move completed by 1993, establishing a major corporate presence that spurred significant development in the area.

The relocation of EDS from its Forest Lane location to the Legacy development in Plano in 1985 was initially driven by the company's growth in the late 1970s.

=== Regained independence ===
In 1996, GM spun off EDS as an independent company.

In the 1990s, in addition to its existing markets, EDS was entering the telecommunications industry and was providing IT systems in many foreign countries. It was providing information systems for global sporting events, including the 1992 Barcelona Olympics, the 1994 FIFA World Cup, and the 1998 FIFA World Cup. In 1994, EDS signed what was at the time the largest information technology contract with Xerox for $3.2 billion (about $6.3 billion in 2025) and also bought the New Zealand banking processing company Databank Systems. In 1995, it purchased A.T. Kearney, the world's fourth-largest private management consulting firm. In 1996, EDS became an independent company again and relisted on the New York Stock Exchange. Before the turn of the century, the company took part in over 1,300 Year 2000 projects. As a part of the move towards being an independent company, EDS asked its employees to assist in the rebranding effort by submitting designs for a new logo. While a design (a square with the "E" in it) was selected and used for several years, the design of Shawn Downs, an employee in the Charlotte IPC, ultimately wasvselected and used in the 2000 launch.

In 2000, EDS launched a new logo with an award-winning Super Bowl commercial about herding cats. After 2000, it continued to sign long-term, billion-dollar contracts with organizations such as Bank of America, American Airlines, GM, Kraft Foods, and the United States Navy.

=== HP acquisition ===
In May 2008, HP confirmed that it had reached a deal with EDS to acquire the company for $13.9 billion (~$20.4 billion in 2025). The deal was completed on August 26, 2008, and EDS became an HP business unit. Ronald A. Rittenmeyer, EDS chairman, president, and CEO, remained at the helm and reported to HP CEO Mark Hurd until his retirement. In December 2008, HP announced that Rittenmeyer would retire at the end of the month.

As of 2008, EDS employed 300,000 people in 64 countries, the largest locations being the U.S., India, and the UK. It was ranked as one of the largest service companies on the Fortune 500 list, with around 2,000 clients.

In September 2009, EDS began going to market as HP Enterprise Services (HPES), a name change that occurred a year after HP announced the acquisition of EDS, and which was a critical milestone as the integration of EDS into HP neared completion.

In 2015, after the Hewlett Packard Enterprise (HPE) spun off from HP, HP Enterprise Services rebranded as Hewlett Packard Enterprise Services (HPES).

=== Merger with CSC into DXC ===
On April 3, 2017, HPES merged with Computer Sciences Corporation to form DXC Technology, retaining significant operations from Plano, Texas, and many aspects of EDS. On June 1, 2018, DXC spun off the U.S. public-services sector of the business through a Reverse Morris Trust, combining with Vencore and KeyPoint Government Solutions to create a new independent and publicly traded government contractor, Perspecta Inc.

== Company structure ==
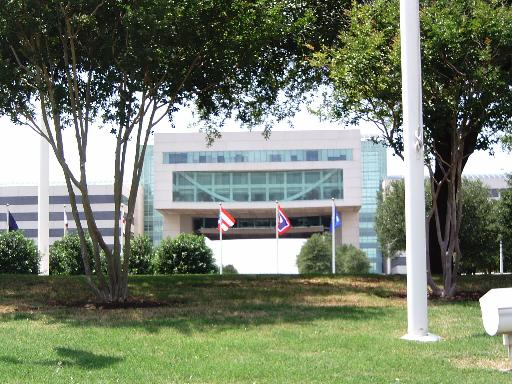
EDS headquarters in Plano, Texas

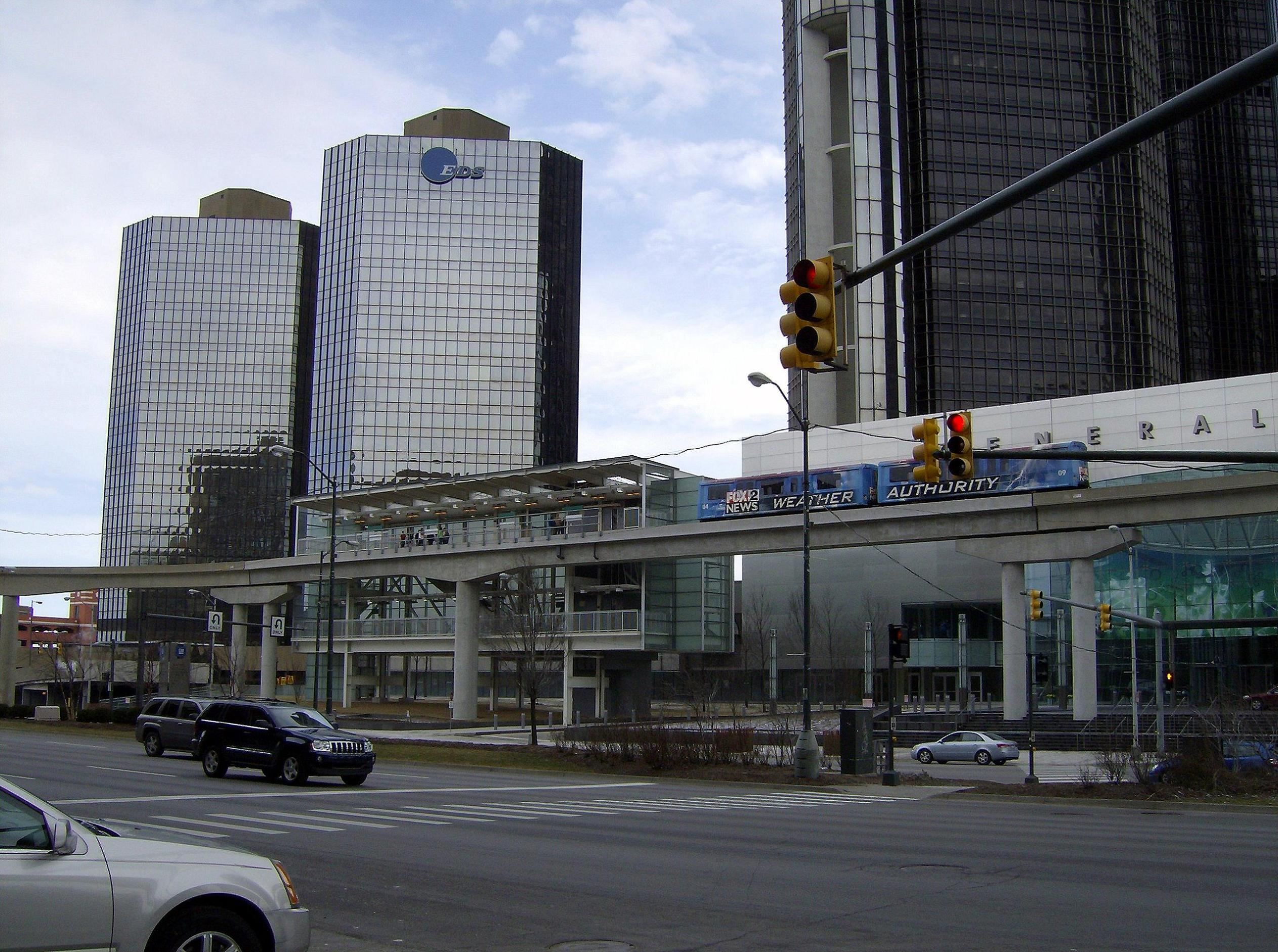
EDS in Tower 500 at the Renaissance Center in Detroit, Michigan

In 2006, EDS sold its management-consulting subsidiary company, A.T. Kearney, in a management buyout and retained interests in five related companies:

- ExcellerateHRO, which offers human resources outsourcing services, was jointly owned by Towers Perrin.
- Injazat Data Systems, a joint venture between EDS and Mubadala Development Company of Abu Dhabi, provided IT and business process outsourcing (BPO) services in the United Arab Emirates, Qatar, and Oman to the government, oil and gas, utilities, financial services, transportation, telecom, and healthcare sectors
- SOLCORP provided software and consulting services for the life insurance and wealth management industry.
- EDS Consumer Loan Services (Wendover) supported consumer loans in the United States.
- MphasiS, operating from Bangalore, India, is an applications development and business processing and infrastructure outsourcing company (BPO). It was merged with the then-EDS India Unit to become MphasiS, an HP company with about 33,000 employees and operated as an independent subsidiary with its own board and was listed on Indian markets as MphasiS Limited.

=== Acquisitions ===
In June 2006, EDS acquired a majority holding in MphasiS, a leading applications and BPO services company based in Bangalore, India.

In March 2007, EDS acquired RelQ Ltd, a testing company also based in Bangalore, India.

In November 2007, EDS announced that it had agreed to purchase an approximate 93% equity interest in Saber Corporation, a leading provider of software and services to U.S. state governments, from various sellers, including majority shareholder Accel-KKR, for around $420 million ($627 million in 2025) in cash. Saber became Saber Government Solutions after merging with other EDS state and local nonhealthcare groups. In January 2009, it rebranded as EDS, an HP company.

In April 2008, EDS acquired Vistorm Holdings Limited, a provider of information assurance and managed security services based in the U.K. The acquisition was to create one of the largest information assurance and managed security services firms in Europe.

In May 2008, HP and EDS announced that they had signed a definitive agreement under which HP would purchase EDS at a price of $25.00 per share, or an enterprise value around $13.9 billion. The terms of the transaction were unanimously approved by the HP and EDS boards of directors. The transaction closed on 26 August 2008. The companies' collective services businesses, as of the end of each company's 2007 fiscal year, had annual revenues of more than $38 billion ($56.8 billion in 2025) and 210,000 employees, doing business in more than 80 countries.

In September 2009, HP purchased Lecroix Systems and incorporated it into the infrastructure of EDS to facilitate both in-house and client network security needs.

=== Revenue sources ===
For 2006, $9.6 billion of revenue came from the Americas (Canada, Latin America, and the United States); $6.4 billion from Europe, the Middle East, and Africa; and $1.5 billion from Asia-Pacific. Services' revenue was: Infrastructure $12 billion, applications software $5.9 billion, BPO $3 billion, and all other $421 million.

EDS announced the expansion of its SAP consulting practice:

By collaborating with SAP on client engagement training and techniques that will drive the long-term growth of its consulting practice, EDS will further enhance its existing SAP capabilities and bring end-to-end SAP consulting and systems integration to the market by early 2008. Additionally, EDS will work closely with SAP's Global Partner and Ecosystem Group for market penetration and value-added customer offerings.

=== Locations ===
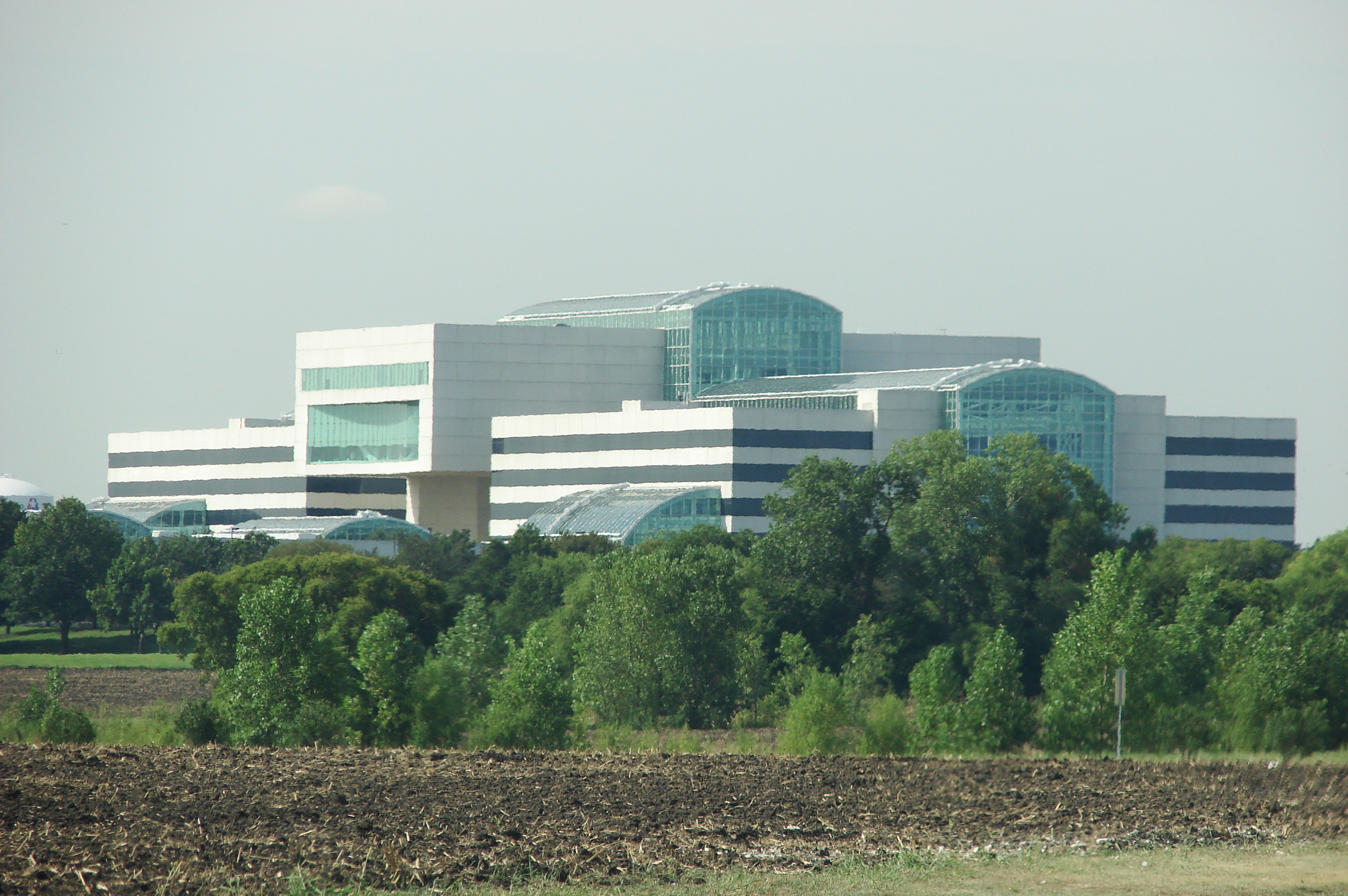
EDS campus in Plano, Texas

EDS operated in 66 countries, with the largest numbers of employees in the cities of Dallas-Fort Worth, Detroit, Philadelphia, Sacramento, and Washington, DC, in the U.S.; São Paulo, Brazil; Toronto, Canada; Rome and Milan, Italy; Paris, France; Adelaide and Sydney, Australia; Blackpool and Tyneside, U.K.; Madrid and Barcelona, Spain; Lisbon, Portugal; Antwerp, Belgium; and Frankfurt, Germany. Other major facilities were in Argentina, Egypt, Hungary, India, Ireland, Israel, Italy, Mexico, the Netherlands, New Zealand, and South Africa.

In 1992, the Plano EDS Headquarters campus comprising two eight-story buildings of office space,connected by an upper-level bridge, was opened. The campus consisted of 3,521,000 square feet (327,100 m^{2}) of office and data center space on 270 acres (110 ha) of land. The campus included four Tier-IV data centers, a command center, four clusters of office buildings, a fitness center, a service station, four helipads and a hangar.

A development plan was proposed to make it the center of the 2,665-acre (1,078 ha) Legacy in Plano real estate development, which EDS built.

In 2026, after various owners attempted to sell or lease it, the EDS complex was demolished to make way for a new AT&T global headquarters. The main building of the former headquarters was demolished by controlled implosion on August 9, 2026.

=== Sponsorships ===
EDS sponsored the Premier League association football team Derby County from 1998 to 2001 and was also a second-tier sponsor at the FIFA World Cups in the U.S.A. 1994 and France 1998.

EDS was the title sponsor of the PGA Tour's EDS Byron Nelson Championship from 2003 to 2008, played in nearby Irving, Texas. In 2009, it became the HP Byron Nelson Championship. The tournament raises about $6 million each year for youth and family service centers in Dallas, Texas.

EDS signed a sponsorship agreement in 2007 with Nobel Media to become a global sponsor of the Nobel Prize Series, and with Nobel Web to become its Global Technology Services Partner. The three-year agreement enables EDS to apply its technology expertise for the benefit of the Nobel Prize Series and the organization's Web technologies, including supporting the development of content on nobelprize.org, Nobel's award-winning website.

EDS sponsored Formula One team Jaguar Racing and was title sponsor of the 1995 Australian Grand Prix.

== Services ==
EDS cataloged its services into three service portfolios - infrastructure, applications, and BPO. Infrastructure services includes maintaining the operation of part or all of a client's computer and communications infrastructure, such as networks, mainframes, "midrange" and web servers, desktops and laptops, and printers. Applications services involves the developing, integrating, and/or maintaining of applications software for clients. BPO includes performing a business function for a client, such as payroll, call centers, insurance claims processing, etc.

=== Partners ===
EDS established a number of business alliances with other companies through its global alliance program. The company has three types - agility, solution, and technology alliances.

The EDS Agility Alliance has worked on a range of projects, notably its Agile Enterprise. Members of the EDS Agility Alliance include Cisco Systems, EMC Corporation, Microsoft, Oracle Corporation, SAP, Sun Microsystems, Symantec, and Xerox.

== Major clients ==
Most of EDS's clients were very large companies and governments that need services from a company of EDS's scale. EDS's largest clients included Rolls-Royce plc, GM, Bank of America, Arcandor, Kraft, United States Navy, the UK Ministry of Defence, and Royal Dutch Shell although GM announced plans to move 90% of its IT work back in house over the next 3 to 5 years starting in 2012.

EDS formed the National Heritage Insurance Company in 1996. The creation of this subsidiary was to manage Medicare Part B services on behalf of the Centers for Medicare and Medicaid Services, formerly the Health Care Financing Administration. The company handles call center, claims processing and payment, fraud investigations, physician enrollment, etc. in many states of the U.S.

Another large EDS client is the U.S. Navy. In 2000, it won a contract for the creation of a US$9 billion Intranet linking the Navy and the Marine Corps, which was set to late 2006, but on March 24, 2006, was extended to 2010, adding $3 billion to the accumulated contract worth. This initiative is known as the Navy Marine Corps Intranet (NMCI), which in 2004 accounted for about 4% of EDS's revenue. NMCI has been called the largest private network in the world, with about 400,000 "seats". EDS provided the network, desktops, laptops, servers, telephones, video conferencing, satellite transceivers, and overall management of the intranet.

Following on to the NMCI type of services, EDS in March 2005 won a US$4 billion (~$6.33 billion in 2025) contract with the UK Ministry of Defence to "consolidate numerous existing information networks into a single next-generation infrastructure ... The network will provide seamless interaction between headquarters, battlefield support and the front line, linking about 150,000 desktop terminals and 340,000 users in approximately 2,000 locations ..."

In February 2008, EDS signed a US$1.3 billion (~$1.91 billion in 2025) contract with the Infocomm Development Authority of Singapore, one of the largest IT projects ever undertaken in Asia. This agreement was to help the Singapore government achieve a standard desktop, network, and messaging/collaboration environment across its public sector by the end of fiscal year 2010.

In October 2008, the U.S. Defense Information Systems Agency (DISA) signed a US$111 million (~$163 million in 2025) contract with EDS. Under this contract, EDS would conduct worldwide security reviews, deliver certification and accreditation support, provide independent evaluation of United States Department of Defense security policies, and conduct security assessments on DoD operating systems, applications, databases, and networks. DoD and EDS have had a 13-year relationship of providing DISA with a wide range of infrastructure services, hardware, and software through the DISA I-Assure and Encore contract vehicles.

Of historical significance, just prior to the overthrow of the Shah of Iran, EDS was the IT company that developed the Iranian social security information system. During the 1979 overthrow, several EDS employees were detained by the transitioning government of Iran, causing H. Ross Perot to undertake extraordinary clandestine measures to get these employees out of Iran. These events were recounted in Ken Follett's book On Wings of Eagles.

== Client contract controversies ==
- In December 2003, EDS lost a 10-year, £3 billion contract to run Inland Revenue IT services after a series of serious delays in the payment of tax credits, the contract instead being awarded to the company Capgemini. EDS had operated systems for the Inland Revenue since 1994, but the performance of its system had been low, causing late arrival of tax credit payments for hundreds of thousands of people.
- In 2004, EDS was criticized by the UK's National Audit Office for its work on IT systems for the UK's Child Support Agency (CSA), which ran seriously over budget causing problems which led to the resignation of the CSA's head, Doug Smith on 2004-11-27. The system's rollout had been two years late and following its introduction in March 2003, the CSA was obliged to write off £1 billion in claims, while £750 million in child-support payments from absent parents remained uncollected. An internal EDS memorandum was leaked that admitted that the CSA's system was "badly designed, badly tested, and badly implemented". UK MPs described it as an "appalling waste of public money" and called for it to be scrapped.
- In 2006, EDS' Joint Personnel Administration system for the Royal Air Force led to thousands of personnel not receiving correct pay due to "processing errors". EDS and MoD staff were reported to have "no definitive explanations for the errors".
- In September 2007, EDS paid $500,000 to settle an action by the United States Securities and Exchange Commission regarding charges related to overstatement of its contract revenues in 2001–2003. At the time, these caused a fall in share prices in 2002, which led to legal action against EDS from U.S. shareholder groups.
- On October 16, 2007, British TV company BSkyB claimed £709 million compensation from EDS, claiming that EDS' failure to meet its agreed service standards resulted not just from incompetence, but from fraud and deceit in the way it pitched for the contract.
- During the BSkyB case, a managing director was found to have obtained a degree over the Internet. Lawyers for Sky were able to demonstrate that the process for awarding the degree claimed would give a degree to a dog, and that the mark attained by the dog was higher than that of the HP executive, who was questioned on his expertise and integrity. HP lost the case, with a preliminary £200 million payment ordered, whilst it appealed the over £700 million total.
- On October 10, 2008, a Ministry of Defence hard drive potentially containing the details of 100,000 armed forces personnel was reported to be lost by EDS.

== See also ==
In 1997, EDS signed its largest IT contract to that date, with the Commonwealth Bank of Australia for US$3.7 billion (~$6.88 billion in 2025) (about AU$5 billion at the prevailing exchange rate).
