= List of engineering schools =

Engineering schools provide engineering education at the higher education level includes both undergraduate and graduate levels. Schools which provide such education are typically part of a university, institute of technology, or polytechnic institute. Such scholastic divisions for engineering are generally referred to by several different names, the most common being College of Engineering or School of Engineering, and typically consist of several departments, each of which has its own faculty and teaches a certain branch of engineering. Students frequently specialize in specific branches of engineering, such as mechanical engineering, electrical engineering, chemical engineering, or civil engineering, among others.

== Bangladesh ==
No.	Division	School/college	Acronym
01	Dhaka	Bangladesh University of Engineering and Technology	BUET
02	Rajshahi	Rajshahi University of Engineering and Technology	BUET
03	Rajshahi	Rajshahi University of Engineering and Technology	RUET
04	Chittagong	Chittagong University of Engineering & Technology	CUET
05	Khulna	Khulna University of Engineering & Technology	KUET
06	Sylhet	Sylhet Engineering College	SEC
07	Dhaka	Military Institute of Science & Technology	MIST
08	Dhaka	Mymensingh Engineering College	MEC
09	Gazipur	Islamic University of Technology	IUT
10	Tejgaon Industrial Area Thana	Ahsanullah University of Science and Technology	AUST
11	Gazipur	Dhaka University of Engineering & Technology	DUET

== Belgium ==
University or school	Faculty or department	Type	Location	Community
University of Liège	Faculty of Applied Science	University	Liège	French
University of Liège	Gembloux Agro-Bio Tech	University	Gembloux	French
Ghent University	Faculty of Engineering and Architecture	University	Ghent	Flemish
UCLouvain	Louvain School of Engineering	University	Louvain-la-Neuve	French
UCLouvain	Faculty of Bioscience Engineering	University	Louvain-la-Neuve	French
UCLouvain	Faculty of Architecture, Architectural Engineering and Urban Planning	University	Brussels and Tournai	French
KU Leuven	Faculty of Engineering Science	University	Leuven	Flemish
University of Mons	Faculté polytechnique de Mons	University	Mons	French
Royal Military Academy	Faculty of Applied Sciences	University	Brussels	Federal institution (bilingual)
Université libre de Bruxelles	École polytechnique de Bruxelles	University	Brussels	French
Vrije Universiteit Brussel	Faculty of Engineering	University	Ixelles	Flemish

== Canada ==
Engineering Schools in Canada are accredited by the Canadian Engineering Accreditation Board and their provincial professional association partners.

Province (city)	University	School	Master's/doctoral programs?
Alberta	University of Alberta	Faculty of Engineering	Yes
British Columbia	University of British Columbia	Faculty of Applied Science	Yes
Ontario	Carleton University	Faculty of Engineering and Design	Yes
British Columbia	British Columbia Institute of Technology	—N/a	Yes
Alberta	University of Calgary	Schulich School of Engineering	Yes
Quebec	Concordia University	Faculty of Engineering and Computer Science	Yes
Ontario	Conestoga College	School of Engineering and Information Technology	No
Nova Scotia	Dalhousie University	Faculty of Engineering	Yes
Quebec	École de technologie supérieure	—N/a	Yes
Ontario	University of Guelph	School of Engineering	Yes
Ontario	Lakehead University	Faculty of Engineering	Yes
Ontario	Laurentian University	Bharti School of Engineering	Yes
Quebec	Université Laval	Faculté des sciences et de génie	Yes
Manitoba	University of Manitoba	Faculty of Engineering	Yes
Quebec	McGill University	Faculty of Engineering	Yes
Ontario	McMaster University	Faculty of Engineering	Yes
Newfoundland	Memorial University of Newfoundland	Faculty of Engineering and Applied Science	Yes
New Brunswick	Université de Moncton	Faculté d'Ingénierie	Yes
New Brunswick	University of New Brunswick	Faculty of Engineering	Yes
British Columbia	University of Northern British Columbia	Department of Environmental Engineering	No
Ontario	University of Ontario Institute of Technology	Faculty of Engineering and Applied Sciences	Yes
Ontario	University of Ottawa	Faculty of Engineering	Yes
Quebec	Université de Montréal	École Polytechnique de Montréal	Yes
Quebec	Université du Québec à Chicoutimi	Département des sciences appliquées	Yes
Quebec	Université du Québec à Montréal	Faculté des sciences	No
Quebec	Université du Québec à Rimouski	Département de mathématiques, informatique et génie	Yes
Quebec	Université du Québec à Trois-Rivières	École d'ingénierie	Yes
Quebec	Université du Québec en Abitibi-Témiscamingue	École de génie	Yes
Quebec	Université du Québec en Outaouais	Département d'informatique et d'ingénierie	Yes
Ontario	Queen's University at Kingston	Faculty of Engineering & Applied Science	Yes
Saskatchewan	University of Regina	Faculty of Engineering and Applied Science	Yes
Ontario	Royal Military College of Canada	Faculty of Engineering	Yes
Ontario	Toronto Metropolitan University	Faculty of Engineering and Architectural Sciences	Yes
Saskatchewan	University of Saskatchewan	College of Engineering	Yes
Quebec	Université de Sherbrooke	Faculté de génie	Yes
British Columbia	Simon Fraser University	Faculty of Applied Sciences	Yes
Ontario	University of Toronto	Faculty of Applied Science & Engineering	Yes
British Columbia	University of Victoria	Faculty of Engineering	Yes
Ontario	University of Waterloo	Faculty of Engineering	Yes
Ontario	University of Western Ontario	Faculty of Engineering	Yes
Ontario	University of Windsor	Faculty of Engineering	Yes
Ontario	York University	Lassonde School of Engineering	Yes

== France ==
- Grandes écoles d'ingénieurs

== India ==
- Indian Institutes of Technology - 23 institutes
- National Institutes of Technology - 31 institutes
- Indian Institutes of Information Technology - 25 institutes
- Cochin University of Science and Technology
- Presidency University
- Jawaharlal Nehru University
- Jadavpur University
- Brainware University
- Shiv Nadar University
- CARE College of Engineering, Trichy, India
- MNR University – School of Engineering, Technology & Artificial Intelligence
- Maulana Abul Kalam Azad University of Technology

== Italy ==
- Polytechnic University of Milan
- Polytechnic University of Turin
- Sapienza University of Rome
- Second University of Naples
- University of Bologna
- University of Catania
- University of Naples Federico II
- University of Padua
- University of Palermo
- University of Pisa
- University of Salento

== Kenya ==
- University of Nairobi- College of Architecture and Engineering
- Jomo Kenyatta University of Agriculture and Technology (JKUAT) - College of Engineering and Technology (COETEC)

== Malaysia ==
State (City)	University	School	Master's/doctoral programs?
Selangor (Gombak)	International Islamic University Malaysia	Faculty of Engineering – Aerospace / Automotive / Biomedical / EE / Mechanical / Manufacturing	Yes
Selangor (Shah Alam)	Universiti Teknologi MARA	Faculty of Engineering – Aerospace / Chemical / Civil / EE / Mechanical / Petroleum	Yes
Selangor (Sungai Long)	Universiti Tunku Abdul Rahman	Lee Kong Chian Faculty of Engineering and Science (LKC FES)	Yes
Perak (Kampar)	Universiti Tunku Abdul Rahman	Faculty of Engineering and Green Technology (FEGT)	Yes
Kuala Lumpur (Setapak)	Tunku Abdul Rahman University College	Faculty of Engineering and Built Environment (FEBE)	No
Johor (Skudai)	Southern University College	Faculty of Engineering and Information Technology (FEIT)	No

== Morocco ==
State (City)	University	School	Master's/doctoral programs?
Al Hoceïma Province (Al Hoceima)	Abdelmalek Essaâdi University	École nationale des sciences appliquées d'Al Hoceima	
Agadir Ida-Outanane Province (Agadir)	Ibn Zohr University	École nationale des sciences appliquées d'Agadir	Yes

== Nepal ==
- Institute of Engineering - 4 institutes

== Philippines ==
Administrative Region	City / Municipality	University / College	Department
National Capital Region	Metro Manila	Adamson University	College of Engineering
National Capital Region	Metro Manila	Ateneo de Manila University	School of Science and Engineering
National Capital Region	Metro Manila	Central Colleges of the Philippines	College of Engineering
National Capital Region	Metro Manila	De La Salle University	Gokongwei College of Engineering
National Capital Region	Metro Manila	Don Bosco Technical College	College Department
National Capital Region	Metro Manila	Far Eastern University – Institute of Technology	College of Engineering
National Capital Region	Metro Manila	Mapúa University	Engineering and Sciences
National Capital Region	Metro Manila	Polytechnic University of the Philippines	College of Engineering
National Capital Region	Metro Manila	Technological Institute of the Philippines	College of Engineering and Architecture
National Capital Region	Metro Manila	Technological University of the Philippines	College of Engineering
National Capital Region	Metro Manila	University of the Philippines	College of Engineering
University of Santo Tomas	Faculty of Engineering (oldest Engineering school in the Philippines)		
Cordillera Administrative Region	Baguio	Saint Louis University (Philippines)	School of Engineering
Cordillera Administrative Region	Baguio	University of Baguio	School of Engineering and Architecture
Region III - Central Luzon	Malolos, Bulacan	Bulacan State University	College of Engineering
Region III - Central Luzon	Bacolor, Pampanga	Don Honorio Ventura Technological State University	College of Engineering
Region III - Central Luzon	Mexico, Pampanga	Don Honorio Ventura Technological State University	College of Engineering
Region IV A - Calabarzon	Batangas City	AMA Computer University	College Department
Region IV A - Calabarzon	Batangas City	Batangas State University	College of Engineering, Architecture and Fine Arts
Region IV A - Calabarzon	Batangas City	Lyceum of the Philippines University–Batangas	College of Engineering and Computer Studies
Region IV A - Calabarzon	Batangas City	STI College	College Department
Region IV A - Calabarzon	Batangas City	University of Batangas	College of Engineering
Region IV A - Calabarzon	Lipa City	AMA Computer University	College Department
Region IV A - Calabarzon	Lipa City	Batangas State University	College of Engineering, Architecture and Fine Arts
Region IV A - Calabarzon	Lipa City	De La Salle Lipa	College of Information and Technology Engineering
Region IV A - Calabarzon	Lipa City	Lipa City Colleges	College of Engineering
Region IV A - Calabarzon	Lipa City	STI College	College Department
Region IV A - Calabarzon	Lipa City	University of Batangas	College of Engineering
Region IV A - Calabarzon	Tanauan City	First Asia Institute of Technology and Humanities	College Department
Region IV A - Calabarzon	Tanauan City	La Consolacion College	College of Engineering
Region IV A - Calabarzon	Tanauan City	STI College	College Department
Region IV A - Calabarzon	Balayan, Batangas	Batangas State University	College of Engineering, Architecture and Fine Arts
Region IV A - Calabarzon	Balayan, Batangas	STI College	College Department
Region IV A - Calabarzon	Nasugbu, Batangas	Batangas State University	College of Engineering, Architecture and Fine Arts
Region IV A - Calabarzon	Malvar, Batangas	Batangas State University	College of Engineering, Architecture and Fine Arts
Region IV A - Calabarzon	Santo Tomas, Batangas	Polytechnic University of the Philippines	College of Engineering
Region IV A - Calabarzon	Bacoor	St. Dominic College of Asia	College Department
Region IV A - Calabarzon	Bacoor	STI College	College Department
Region IV A - Calabarzon	Bacoor	University of Perpetual Help System DALTA – Molino Campus	College of Engineering
Region IV A - Calabarzon	Cavite City	AMA Computer University	College Department
Region IV A - Calabarzon	Cavite City	San Sebastian College–Recoletos de Cavite	College of Engineering
Region IV A - Calabarzon	Dasmariñas	AMA Computer University	College Department
Region IV A - Calabarzon	Dasmariñas	De La Salle University – Dasmariñas	College of Engineering, Architecture and Technology
Region IV A - Calabarzon	Dasmariñas	Emilio Aguinaldo College	School of Engineering and Technology
Region IV A - Calabarzon	Dasmariñas	PNTC Colleges	College Department
Region IV A - Calabarzon	Dasmariñas	National College of Science and Technology	College Department
Region IV A - Calabarzon	Dasmariñas	Philippine Christian University	College of Engineering
Region IV A - Calabarzon	Dasmariñas	STI College	College Department
Region IV A - Calabarzon	Dasmariñas	Technological University of the Philippines – Cavite	College of Engineering
Region IV A - Calabarzon	Imus City	Imus Institute	College Department
Region IV A - Calabarzon	Imus City	Imus Computer College	College Department
Region IV A - Calabarzon	Imus City	Southern Philippines Institute of Science & Technology	College Department
Region IV A - Calabarzon	Carmona, Cavite	STI College	College Department
Region IV A - Calabarzon	Indang, Cavite	Cavite State University	College of Engineering and Information Technology
Region IV A - Calabarzon	Maragondon, Cavite	Polytechnic University of the Philippines Maragondon	College of Engineering
Region IV A - Calabarzon	Rosario, Cavite	Cavite State University Rosario Campus	College of Engineering and Information Technology
Region IV A - Calabarzon	Rosario, Cavite	STI College	College Department
Region IV A - Calabarzon	Silang, Cavite	Adventist University of the Philippines	College of Engineering
Region IV A - Calabarzon	Silang, Cavite	Rogationist College	College Department
Region IV A - Calabarzon	Calamba	AMA Computer University	College Department
Region IV A - Calabarzon	Calamba	Colegio de San Juan de Letran	College of Engineering
Region IV A - Calabarzon	Calamba	Laguna College of Business and Arts	College Department
Region IV A - Calabarzon	Calamba	Lyceum of the Philippines University-Laguna	College of Engineering and Computer Studies
Region IV A - Calabarzon	Calamba	STI College	College Department
Region IV A - Calabarzon	Calamba	University of Perpetual Help System Laguna	College of Engineering
Region IV A - Calabarzon	Santa Rosa City	Polytechnic University of the Philippines	College of Engineering
Region IV A - Calabarzon	Santa Rosa City	STI College	College Department
Region IV A - Calabarzon	San Pablo City	Laguna State Polytechnic University	College of Engineering
Region IV A - Calabarzon	San Pablo City	Laguna College	College Department
Region IV A - Calabarzon	San Pablo City	STI College	College Department
Region IV A - Calabarzon	Biñan, Laguna	AMA Computer University	College Department
Region IV A - Calabarzon	Biñan, Laguna	De La Salle Canlubang	School of Engineering
Region IV A - Calabarzon	Biñan, Laguna	University of Perpetual Help System Biñan	College of Engineering
Region IV A - Calabarzon	Biñan, Laguna	Polytechnic University of the Philippines Biñan	College of Engineering
Region IV A - Calabarzon	Cabuyao, Laguna	Malayan Colleges Laguna	College Department
Region IV A - Calabarzon	Cabuyao, Laguna	Pamantasan ng Cabuyao	College of Engineering
Region IV A - Calabarzon	Los Baños, Laguna	University of the Philippines Los Baños	College of Engineering and Agro-Industrial Technology
Region IV A - Calabarzon	Santa Cruz, Laguna	AMA Computer University	College Department
Region IV A - Calabarzon	Santa Cruz, Laguna	Laguna State Polytechnic University	College of Engineering
Region IV A - Calabarzon	Santa Cruz, Laguna	Laguna University	College of Engineering
Region IV A - Calabarzon	San Pedro, Laguna	Laguna Northwestern College	College Department
Region IV A - Calabarzon	San Pedro, Laguna	San Pedro College of Business Administration	Department of Computer Studies and Engineering
Region IV A - Calabarzon	Lucena City	AMA Computer University	College Department
Region IV A - Calabarzon	Lucena City	Manuel S. Enverga University Foundation - Lucena City, Quezon	College of Engineering and Technical Department
Region IV A - Calabarzon	Lucban, Quezon	Southern Luzon State University	College of Engineering
Region IV A - Calabarzon	Lopez, Quezon	Technological University of the Philippines	College of Engineering
Region IV A - Calabarzon	Lopez, Quezon	Polytechnic University of the Philippines	College of Engineering
Region IV A - Calabarzon	Antipolo	AMA Computer University	College Department
Region IV A - Calabarzon	Antipolo	ICCT Colleges Foundation Inc. (Cogeo)	College Department
Region IV A - Calabarzon	Antipolo	ICCT Colleges Foundation Inc.	College Department
Region IV A - Calabarzon	Angono, Rizal	ICCT Colleges Foundation Inc.	College Department
Region IV A - Calabarzon	Angono, Rizal	ICCT Colleges Foundation Inc. (Sumulong)	College Department
Region IV A - Calabarzon	Cainta, Rizal	Informatics International College - Cainta	College Department
Region IV A - Calabarzon	Cainta, Rizal	ICCT Colleges Foundation Inc.	College Department
Region IV A - Calabarzon	Cainta, Rizal	STI College	College Department
Region IV A - Calabarzon	Morong, Rizal	University of Rizal System	College of Engineering
Region IV A - Calabarzon	Rodriguez, Rizal	Pamantasan ng Montalban	College of Engineering and Technology
Region IV A - Calabarzon	San Mateo, Rizal	ICCT Colleges Foundation Inc.	College Department
Region IV A - Calabarzon	Tanay, Rizal	STI College	College Department
Region IV A - Calabarzon	Taytay, Rizal	ICCT Colleges Foundation Inc.	College Department
Region IV B - Mimaropa	Puerto Princesa City	Holy Trinity University	College of Engineering & Technology
Region IV B - Mimaropa	Puerto Princesa City	Palawan State University	College of Engineering Architecture and Technology
Region IV B - Mimaropa	Puerto Princesa City	STI College	College Department
Region IV B - Mimaropa	Puerto Princesa City	Western Philippines University	College of Engineering
Region IV B - Mimaropa	Aborlan, Palawan	Western Philippines University	College of Engineering
Region IV B - Mimaropa	Araceli, Palawan	Palawan State University	College of Engineering Architecture and Technology
Region IV B - Mimaropa	Brooke's Point, Palawan	Palawan State University	College of Engineering Architecture and Technology
Region IV B - Mimaropa	Culion, Palawan	Western Philippines University	College of Engineering
Region IV B - Mimaropa	Narra, Palawan	Palawan State University	College of Engineering Architecture and Technology
Region IV B - Mimaropa	Quezon, Palawan	Palawan State University	College of Engineering Architecture and Technology
Region IV B - Mimaropa	Rizal, Palawan	Palawan State University	College of Engineering Architecture and Technology
Region IV B - Mimaropa	Sofronio Española, Palawan		College of Engineering Architecture and Technology
Region V - Bicol Region	Iriga City, Camarines Sur	University of Saint Anthony University of Northeastern Philippines	College of Engineering
Region V - Bicol Region	Daet, Camarines Norte	Camarines Norte State College	College of Engineering and industrial Technology
Region V - Bicol Region	Daet, Camarines Norte	La Consolacion College – Daet	College of Engineering
Region V - Bicol Region	Panganiban, Catanduanes	Camarines Norte State College	College of Engineering and industrial Technology
Region V - Bicol Region	Goa, Camarines Sur	Partido State University	School of Engineering
Region V - Bicol Region	Nabua, Camarines Sur	Camarines Sur Polytechnic Colleges	College of Engineering
Region V - Bicol Region	Legazpi City, Albay	AMA Computer University	College Department
Region V - Bicol Region	Legazpi City, Albay	Aquinas University of Legazpi	College of Engineering
Region V - Bicol Region	Legazpi City, Albay	Bicol University	Bicol University College of Engineering (BUCENG)
Region V - Bicol Region	Legazpi City, Albay	Computer Arts and Technological College	College Department
Region V - Bicol Region	Legazpi City, Albay	Divine Word College of Legazpi	College of Engineering and Computer Studies
Region V - Bicol Region	Legazpi City, Albay	STI College	College Department
Region V - Bicol Region	Polangui, Albay	Bicol University	College Department
Region V - Bicol Region	Naga City	AMA Computer University	College Department
Region V - Bicol Region	Naga City	Ateneo de Naga University	College of Engineering
Region V - Bicol Region	Naga City	Bicol State College of Applied Sciences and Technology	College Department
Region V - Bicol Region	Naga City	Naga College Foundation	College of Engineering and Technology
Region V - Bicol Region	Naga City	STI College	College Department
Region V - Bicol Region	Naga City	University of Nueva Caceres	College of Engineering and Architecture
Region V - Bicol Region	Sorsogon City	Sorsogon State College	Sorsogon State College Engineering-Architecture Department
Region V - Bicol Region	Masbate City	Masbate College	College Department
Region IX - Zamboanga Peninsula	Dipolog	Andres Bonifacio College	College of Engineering
Region IX - Zamboanga Peninsula	Dipolog	Dipolog Medical Centre Foundation College, Inc	College Department
Region IX - Zamboanga Peninsula	Dipolog	STI College	College Department
Region IX - Zamboanga Peninsula	Dapitan	Jose Rizal Memorial State University	College of Engineering
Region IX - Zamboanga Peninsula	Tampilisan, Zamboanga del Norte	Jose Rizal Memorial State University	College Department (Agricultural Engineering)
Region IX - Zamboanga Peninsula	Pagadian City	STI College	College Department
Region IX - Zamboanga Peninsula	Pagadian City	Josefina H. Cerilles Polytechnic College	School of Engineering and Technology
Region IX - Zamboanga Peninsula	Pagadian City	Southern Mindanao Colleges	College of Engineering
Region IX - Zamboanga Peninsula	Pagadian City	Western Mindanao State University	WMSU ESU Pagadian - College Department
Region IX - Zamboanga Peninsula	Pagadian City	Zamboanga Del Sur Maritime Institute of Technology	College of Engineering and Technology
Region IX - Zamboanga Peninsula	Zamboanga City	AMA Computer University	College Department
Region IX - Zamboanga Peninsula	Zamboanga City	Ateneo de Zamboanga University	under School of Education (SEd)
Region IX - Zamboanga Peninsula	Zamboanga City	Colegio Moderno Technico y Informatico	College Department (Marine Engineering)
Region IX - Zamboanga Peninsula	Zamboanga City	Southern City Colleges	College Department
Region IX - Zamboanga Peninsula	Zamboanga City	STI College	College Department
Region IX - Zamboanga Peninsula	Zamboanga City	Universidad de Zamboanga	School of Engineering and Information Communication Technology
Region IX - Zamboanga Peninsula	Zamboanga City	Western Mindanao State University	College of Engineering and Technology
Region IX - Zamboanga Peninsula	Zamboanga City	Western Mindanao State University	College of Agriculture (Agricultural Engineering)
Region IX - Zamboanga Peninsula	Zamboanga City	Zamboanga City State Polytechnic College	College of Marine Engineering
Region IX - Zamboanga Peninsula	Zamboanga City	Zamboanga City State Polytechnic College	College of Technology
Region IX - Zamboanga Peninsula	Zamboanga City	Zamboanga State College of Marine Sciences and Technology	College of Marine Engineering
Region IX - Zamboanga Peninsula	Ipil, Zamboanga Sibugay	Universidad de Zamboanga	College Department
Region IX - Zamboanga Peninsula	Ipil, Zamboanga Sibugay	Western Mindanao State University	WMSU ESU Ipil - College Department
Region IX - Zamboanga Peninsula	Jolo, Sulu	Sulu State University	College Department
Region IX - Zamboanga Peninsula	Maimbung, Sulu	Sulu State University	College Department (Maimbung Annex)
Region X - Northern Mindanao	Cagayan de Oro	AMA Computer University	College Department
Region X - Northern Mindanao	Cagayan de Oro	Capitol University	College of Engineering
Region X - Northern Mindanao	Cagayan de Oro	Cagayan de Oro College	College of Engineering and Architecture
Region X - Northern Mindanao	Cagayan de Oro	Liceo de Cagayan University	College of Engineering
Region X - Northern Mindanao	Cagayan de Oro	Mindanao University of Science and Technology	College of Engineering and Architecture
Region X - Northern Mindanao	Cagayan de Oro	STI College	College Department
Region X - Northern Mindanao	Cagayan de Oro	Xavier University	College of Engineering
Region X - Northern Mindanao	Iligan City	Mindanao State University - Iligan Institute of Technology	College of Engineering
Region X - Northern Mindanao	Iligan City	STI College	College Department
Region X - Northern Mindanao	Iligan City	St. Michael's College	College Department
Region X - Northern Mindanao	Iligan City	St. Peter College	College Department
Region X - Northern Mindanao	Maigo, Lanao del Norte	Mindanao State University - Maigo College of Education, Science and Technology	College Department
Region X - Northern Mindanao	Malaybalay City	STI College	College Department
Region X - Northern Mindanao	Malaybalay City	San Isidro College	College Department
Region X - Northern Mindanao	Valencia City	STI College	College Department
Region X - Northern Mindanao	Maramag, Bukidnon	Central Mindanao University	College of Engineering
Region X - Northern Mindanao	Ozamiz City	La Salle University - Ozamiz	College of Computer Studies, Engineering, and Architecture
Region X - Northern Mindanao	Ozamiz City	Misamis University	College of Engineering and Technology
Region X - Northern Mindanao	Claveria, Misamis Oriental	Misamis Oriental State College of Agriculture and Technology	Institute of Agriculture (Agricultural Engineering)
Region XI - Davao Region	Davao City	AMA Computer University	College Department
Region XI - Davao Region	Davao City	Ateneo de Davao University	School of Engineering and Architecture
Region XI - Davao Region	Davao City	Holy Cross of Davao College Inc.	College of Engineering and Technology
Region XI - Davao Region	Davao City	Jose Maria College of Davao City	College Department
Region XI - Davao Region	Davao City	STI College	College Department
Region XI - Davao Region	Davao City	University of the Immaculate Conception	College Department
Region XI - Davao Region	Davao City	University of Mindanao	College of Engineering
Region XI - Davao Region	Davao City	University of Southeastern Philippines	College of Engineering
Region XI - Davao Region	Digos	Cor Jesu College	Engineering and Technology Division
Region XI - Davao Region	Digos	Southern Philippines Agriculture, Business, Marine and Aquatic School of Technology	The Institute of Computing, Engineering and Technology (ICET)
Region XI - Davao Region	Mati City	Davao Oriental State College of Science and Technology	Institute of Computing and Engineering
Region XI - Davao Region	Tagum City	STI College	College Department
Region XI - Davao Region	Tagum City	University of Mindanao	College of Engineering
Region XII - Soccsksargen	General Santos	AMA Computer University	College Department
Region XII - Soccsksargen	General Santos	Holy Trinity College of General Santos City	College of Engineering and Technology Education
Region XII - Soccsksargen	General Santos	Mindanao State University – General Santos	College of Engineering
Region XII - Soccsksargen	General Santos	Mindanao Polytechnic College	College Department
Region XII - Soccsksargen	General Santos	Notre Dame of Dadiangas University	College of Engineering and Technology
Region XII - Soccsksargen	General Santos	STI College	College Department
Region XII - Soccsksargen	Koronadal City	Notre Dame of Marbel University	College of Engineering and Technology
Region XII - Soccsksargen	Koronadal City	STI College	College Department
Region XII - Soccsksargen	Kabacan, Cotabato	University of Southern Mindanao	College of Engineering and Computing
Region XII - Soccsksargen	Cotabato City	AMA Computer University	College Department
Region XII - Soccsksargen	Cotabato City	Cotabato City State Polytechnic College	College Department
Region XII - Soccsksargen	Cotabato City	Notre Dame University - Cotabato	College of Engineering
Region XII - Soccsksargen	Cotabato City	STI College	College Department
Region XII - Soccsksargen	Isulan, Sultan Kudarat	Sultan Kudarat State University	College of Engineering
Region XII - Soccsksargen	Tacurong City	STI College	College Department
Region XII - Soccsksargen	Tacurong City	Sultan Kudarat State University	College of Engineering
Region XIII - Caraga	Butuan	Caraga State University	College of Engineering and Information Technology
Region XIII - Caraga	Butuan	Father Saturnino Urios University	College of Engineering and Technology
Region XIII - Caraga	Butuan	Saint Joseph Institute of Technology	College of Engineering and Architecture
Region XIII - Caraga	Cabadbaran	Caraga State University	College of Engineering and Information Technology
Region XIII - Caraga	Surigao City	Saint Paul University Surigao	College of Engineering and Information Technology
Region XIII - Caraga	Surigao City	STI College	College Department
Region XIII - Caraga	Surigao City	Surigao State College of Technology	College Department
Region XIII - Caraga	Bislig	University of Southeastern Philippines	College of Engineering
Region XIII - Caraga	Tandag City	Surigao del Sur State University	College of Engineering and Technology
Region XIII - Caraga	San Francisco, Agusan del Sur	STI College	College Department
Region XIII - Caraga	Siargao	Siargao National College of School and Technology	College Department
Negros Island Region	Dumaguete	Silliman University	College of Engineering and Design
Bangsamoro	Marawi City	Mindanao State University	College of Engineering

== Russia ==
- Moscow Aviation Institute (National Research University)
- Bauman Moscow State Technical University
- Far Eastern Federal University - Engineering School
- Irkutsk State Technical University
- Military Engineering-Technical University
- MISA National University of Science and Technology or MISiS, Moscow Institute of Steel and Alloys
- Moscow Institute of Physics and Technology
- Moscow Power Engineering Institute
- Moscow State Institute of Radio Engineering, Electronics and Automation
- Nizhny Novgorod State Technical University
- Novosibirsk State Technical University
- Omsk State Technical University
- Pskov State Polytechnic Institute
- Saint Petersburg Academic University
- Saint Petersburg State Institute of Technology
- Saint Petersburg State Polytechnical University
- Saint Petersburg State University of Aerospace Instrumentation
- Saint Petersburg State University of Engineering and Economics
- Saint Petersburg State University of Information Technologies, Mechanics and Optics
- South Ural State University
- Southern Federal University
- Tomsk Polytechnic University
- Ural Federal University

== South Korea ==
- Seoul National University College of Engineering
- Hanyang University College of Engineering
- KAIST
- Pohang University of Science and Technology (POSTECH)

== Sri Lanka ==
Province (city)	University	School	Master's/doctoral programs?
Central Province (peradeniya)	University of Peradeniya	Faculty of Engineering	Yes
Southern Province (Galle)	University of Ruhuna	Faculty of Engineering	Yes
Western Province (Moratuwa)	University of Moratuwa	Faculty of Engineering	Yes
Northern Province (Kilinochchi)	University of Jaffna	Faculty of Engineering	No
Eastern Province (Oluvil)	South Eastern University of Sri Lanka	Faculty of Engineering	No
Western Province (Colombo)	University of Sri Jayewardenepura	Faculty of Engineering	No

== Taiwan ==
- National Dong Hwa University College of Science and Engineering
- College of Engineering, National Tsing Hua University (NTHU)

== Thailand ==
- Bangkok University
- Chulalongkorn University
- Kasetsart University
- King Mongkut's University of Technology Thonburi
- King Mongkut's University of Technology North Bangkok
- Khon Kaen University
- King Mongkut's Institute of Technology Ladkrabang
- Prince of Songkla University
- Chiang Mai University
- Rajamangala University of Technology Thanyaburi
- Thammasat University
- Mahidol University
- Burapha University
- Silpakorn University
- Srinakharinwirot University
- Suranaree University of Technology

== United States ==
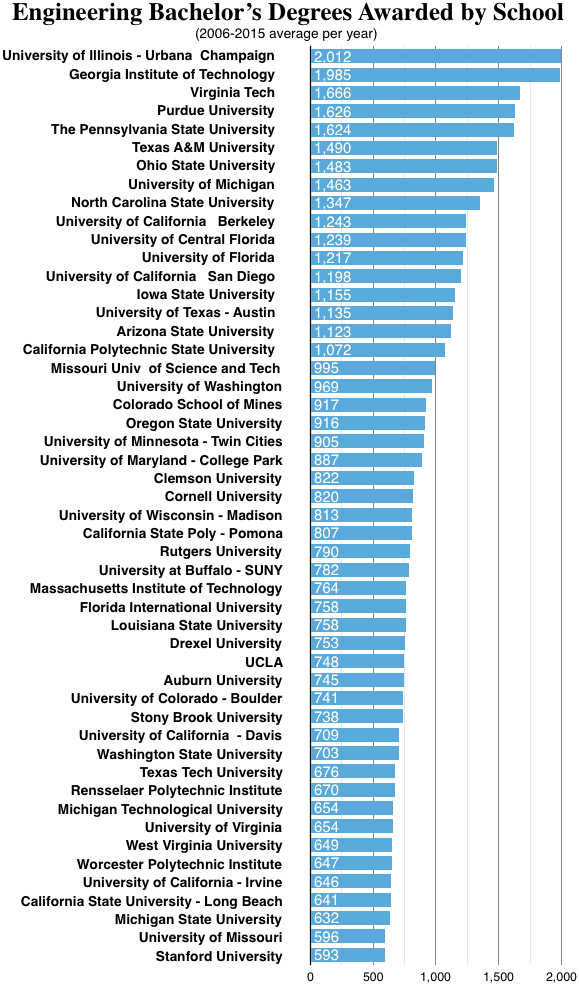
Engineering bachelor's degrees Awarded by School

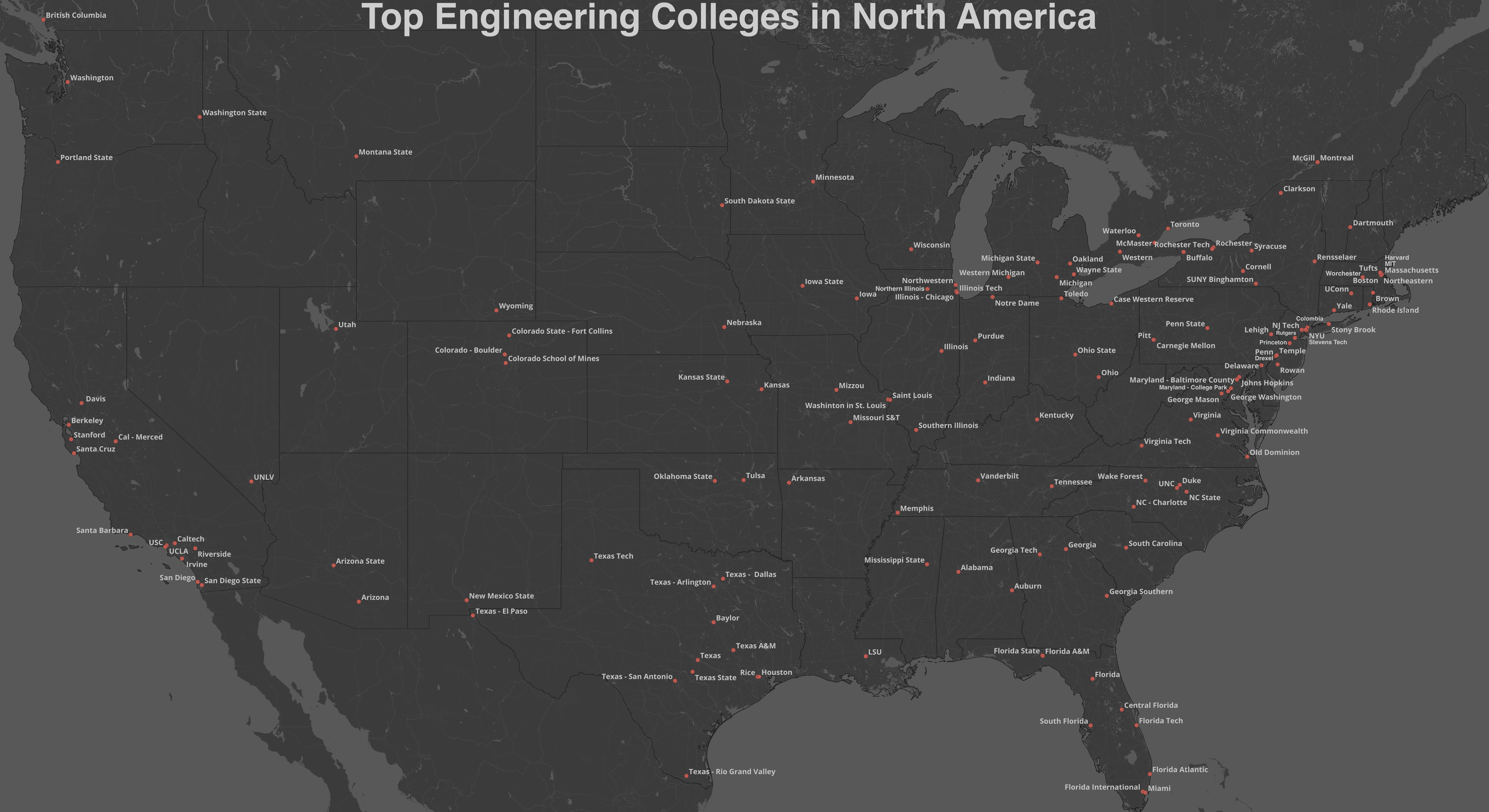
Top Engineering Colleges in North America

The following is a list of schools with ABET-accredited bachelor's degrees programs in engineering:

State (city)	University	School	Master's/doctoral programs?
Alaska (Anchorage)	University of Alaska Anchorage	School of Engineering	Yes
Alaska (Fairbanks)	University of Alaska Fairbanks	College of Engineering and Mines	Yes
Alabama (Huntsville)	Alabama A&M University	College of Engineering, Technology, and Physical Sciences	Yes
Alabama (Auburn)	Auburn University	Samuel Ginn College of Engineering	Yes
Alabama (Tuskegee)	Tuskegee University	College of Engineering	Yes
Alabama (Birmingham)	University of Alabama at Birmingham	School of Engineering	Yes
Alabama (Huntsville)	University of Alabama in Huntsville	College of Engineering	Yes
Alabama (Tuscaloosa)	University of Alabama	College of Engineering	Yes
Alabama (Mobile)	University of South Alabama	College of Engineering	Yes
Arizona (Tempe)	Arizona State University	Ira A. Fulton Schools of Engineering	Yes
Arizona (Prescott)	Embry–Riddle Aeronautical University	College of Engineering	Yes
Arizona (Flagstaff)	Northern Arizona University	College of Engineering, Forestry, and Natural Sciences	Yes
Arizona (Tucson)	University of Arizona	College of Engineering	Yes
Arkansas (Jonesboro)	Arkansas State University	College of Engineering	Yes
Arkansas (Russellville)	Arkansas Tech University	College of Applied Sciences	Yes
Arkansas (Russellville)	John Brown University	Division of Engineering and Construction Management	No
Arkansas (Fayetteville)	University of Arkansas	College of Engineering	Yes
Arkansas (Little Rock)	University of Arkansas at Little Rock	Donaghey College of Engineering and Information Technology	Yes
California (Riverside)	California Baptist University	Gordon and Jill Bourns College of Engineering	No
California (Pasadena)	California Institute of Technology	Division of Engineering and Applied Science	Yes
California (Vallejo)	Cal Poly Maritime Academy	Various departments	
California (San Luis Obispo)	California Polytechnic State University	College of Engineering	
California (Pomona)	California State Polytechnic University, Pomona	College of Engineering	Yes
California (Chico)	California State University, Chico	College of Engineering, Computer Science, and Construction Management	No
California (East Bay)	California State University, East Bay	Department of Engineering	
California (Fresno)	California State University, Fresno	Lyles College of Engineering	
California (Fullerton)	California State University, Fullerton	College of Engineering and Computer Science	Yes
California (Long Beach)	California State University, Long Beach	College of Engineering	Yes
California (Los Angeles)	California State University, Los Angeles	College of Engineering, Computer Science, and Technology	
California (Northridge)	California State University, Northridge	College of Engineering and Computer Science	
California (Sacramento)	California State University, Sacramento	College of Engineering and Computer Science	Yes
California (Claremont)	Harvey Mudd College		No
California (Arcata)	Humboldt State University	Environmental Resources Engineering Department	No
California (Los Angeles)	Loyola Marymount University	Frank R. Seaver College of Science and Engineering	Yes
California (San Diego)	San Diego State University	College of Engineering	Yes
California (San Francisco)	San Francisco State University	School of Engineering	
California (San Jose)	San Jose State University	Charles W. Davidson College of Engineering	Yes
California (Santa Clara)	Santa Clara University	School of Engineering	Yes
California (Stanford)	Stanford University	School of Engineering	Yes
California (Berkeley)	University of California, Berkeley	College of Engineering	Yes
California (Davis)	University of California, Davis	College of Engineering	Yes
California (Irvine)	University of California, Irvine	Henry Samueli School of Engineering	Yes
California (Los Angeles)	University of California, Los Angeles	Henry Samueli School of Engineering and Applied Science	Yes
California (Riverside)	University of California, Riverside	Bourns College of Engineering	Yes
California (San Diego)	University of California, San Diego	Jacobs School of Engineering	Yes
California (Santa Barbara)	University of California, Santa Barbara	College of Engineering	Yes
California (Santa Cruz)	University of California, Santa Cruz	Jack Baskin School of Engineering	Yes
California (San Diego)	University of San Diego	Shiley-Marcos School of Engineering	Yes
California (Los Angeles)	University of Southern California	Viterbi School of Engineering	Yes
California (Stockton)	University of the Pacific	School of Engineering and Computer Science	
Colorado (Golden)	Colorado School of Mines	Division of Engineering	
Colorado (Fort Collins)	Colorado State University	College of Engineering	
Colorado (Pueblo)	Colorado State University–Pueblo	Department of Engineering	
Colorado (Colorado Springs)	Colorado Technical University	College of Engineering and Computer Science	
Colorado (Durango)	Fort Lewis College		No
Colorado (Colorado Springs)	United States Air Force Academy	Engineering Division	No
Colorado (Boulder)	University of Colorado at Boulder	College of Engineering and Applied Science	Yes
Colorado (Colorado Springs)	University of Colorado Colorado Springs	College of Engineering and Applied Science	
Colorado (Denver)	University of Colorado Denver	College of Engineering and Applied Science	
Colorado (Denver)	University of Denver	School of Engineering and Computer Science	
Connecticut (New Britain)	Central Connecticut State University	School of Engineering, Science and Technology	No
Connecticut (Fairfield)	Fairfield University	School of Engineering	
Connecticut (Hartford)	Trinity College	Engineering Department	
Connecticut (New London)	United States Coast Guard Academy	Engineering Department	
Connecticut (Bridgeport)	University of Bridgeport	School of Engineering	
Connecticut (Storrs)	University of Connecticut	UConn School of Engineering	Yes
Connecticut (West Hartford)	University of Hartford	College of Engineering, Technology, and Architecture	
Connecticut (New Haven)	University of New Haven	Tagliatela College of Engineering	Yes
Connecticut (New Haven)	Yale University	School of Engineering and Applied Science	Yes
District of Columbia	Catholic University of America	School of Engineering	Yes
District of Columbia	George Washington University	School of Engineering and Applied Science	Yes
District of Columbia	Howard University	College of Engineering, Architecture and Computer Sciences	Yes
District of Columbia	University of the District of Columbia	School of Engineering	
Delaware (Newark)	University of Delaware	College of Engineering	Yes
Florida (Daytona Beach)	Embry–Riddle Aeronautical University	College of Engineering	
Florida (Tallahassee)	Florida A&M University-Florida State University	College of Engineering	Yes
Florida (Boca Raton)	Florida Atlantic University	College of Engineering and Computer Science	Yes
Florida (Melbourne)	Florida Institute of Technology	College of Engineering	Yes
Florida (Miami)	Florida International University	College of Engineering	Yes
Florida (Orlando)	University of Central Florida	College of Engineering and Computer Science	Yes
Florida (Gainesville)	University of Florida	College of Engineering	Yes
Florida (Coral Gables)	University of Miami	College of Engineering	Yes
Florida (Jacksonville)	University of North Florida	School of Engineering	
Florida (Tampa)	University of South Florida	College of Engineering	Yes
Florida (Pensacola)	University of West Florida	School of Science and Engineering	
Georgia (Atlanta)	Georgia Institute of Technology	College of Engineering	Yes
Georgia (Statesboro)	Georgia Southern University	Allen E. Paulson College of Engineering and Information Technology	Yes
Georgia (Marietta)	Kennesaw State University	Southern Polytechnic College of Engineering and Engineering Technology	Yes
Georgia (Macon)	Mercer University	School of Engineering	Yes
Georgia (Athens)	University of Georgia	College of Engineering	Yes
Hawaii (Honolulu)	University of Hawaiʻi at Mānoa	College of Engineering	
Idaho (Boise)	Boise State University	College of Engineering	
Idaho (Rexburg)	Brigham Young University–Idaho	College of Physical Sciences and Engineering	
Idaho (Pocatello)	Idaho State University	School of Engineering	
Idaho (Moscow)	University of Idaho	College of Engineering	
Illinois (Peoria)	Bradley University	College of Engineering and Technology	
Illinois (Chicago)	Illinois Institute of Technology	Armour College of Engineering	Yes
Illinois (DeKalb)	Northern Illinois University	College of Engineering and Engineering Technology	
Illinois (Evanston)	Northwestern University	Robert R. McCormick School of Engineering and Applied Science	Yes
Illinois (Bourbonnais)	Olivet Nazarene University	School of Professional Studies	
Illinois (Carbondale)	Southern Illinois University Carbondale	College of Engineering	
Illinois (Edwardsville)	Southern Illinois University Edwardsville	School of Engineering	Yes
Illinois (Chicago)	University of Illinois at Chicago	College of Engineering	Yes
Illinois (Urbana)	University of Illinois at Urbana–Champaign	Grainger College of Engineering	Yes
Indiana (Fort Wayne)	Indiana Institute of Technology	College of Engineering	
Indiana (Fort Wayne)	Indiana University – Purdue; University Fort Wayne	College of Engineering, Technology, and Computer Science, Department of Engineering	
Indiana (Indianapolis)	Indiana University – Purdue; University Indianapolis	Purdue School of Engineering and Technology	
Indiana (Calumet)	Purdue University Calumet		
Indiana (West Lafayette)	Purdue University	College of Engineering	Yes
Indiana (Terre Haute)	Rose–Hulman Institute of Technology		Yes
Indiana (Angola)	Trine University	Allen School of Engineering	
Indiana (Evansville)	University of Evansville	College of Engineering and Computer Science	
Indiana (South Bend)	University of Notre Dame	College of Engineering	Yes
Indiana (Valparaiso)	Valparaiso University	College of Engineering	Yes
Iowa (Sioux Center)	Dordt University	Department of Engineering	
Iowa (Ames)	Iowa State University	College of Engineering	Yes
Iowa (Davenport)	St. Ambrose University		
Iowa (Iowa City)	University of Iowa	College of Engineering	Yes
Kansas (Manhattan)	Kansas State University	College of Engineering	Yes
Kansas (Lawrence)	University of Kansas	School of Engineering	Yes
Kansas (Wichita)	Wichita State University	College of Engineering	Yes
Kentucky (Murray)	Murray State University	College of Science, Engineering and Technology	
Kentucky (Lexington)	University of Kentucky	College of Engineering	Yes
Kentucky (Louisville)	University of Louisville	J. B. Speed School of Engineering	Yes
Kentucky (Bowling Green)	Western Kentucky University	Ogden College of Science and Engineering, Department of Engineering	No
Louisiana (Baton Rouge)	Louisiana State University	College of Engineering	Yes
Louisiana (Ruston)	Louisiana Tech University	College of Engineering and Science	Yes
Louisiana (Lake Charles)	McNeese State University	College of Engineering and Engineering Technology	Yes
Louisiana (Baton Rouge)	Southern University	College of Engineering	
Louisiana (New Orleans)	Tulane University	School of Science and Engineering	Yes
Louisiana (Lafayette)	University of Louisiana at Lafayette	College of Engineering	
Louisiana (New Orleans)	LSU New Orleans	College of Engineering	
Maine (Castine)	Maine Maritime Academy		
Maine (Orono)	University of Maine	College of Engineering	
Maine (Portland)	University of Southern Maine	School of Engineering and Physical Sciences	
Maryland (Laurel)	Capitol College		
Maryland (Baltimore)	Johns Hopkins University	Whiting School of Engineering	Yes
Maryland (Baltimore)	Loyola University Maryland	Department of Engineering	
Maryland (Baltimore)	Morgan State University	Clarence M. Mitchell, Jr. School of Engineering	Yes
Maryland (Annapolis)	United States Naval Academy		
Maryland (Catonsville)	University of Maryland, Baltimore County	College of Engineering and Information Technology	
Maryland (College Park)	University of Maryland, College Park	A. James Clark School of Engineering	Yes
Massachusetts (Boston)	Boston University	College of Engineering	Yes
Massachusetts (Cambridge)	Harvard University	School of Engineering and Applied Sciences	Yes
Massachusetts (Cambridge)	Massachusetts Institute of Technology	School of Engineering	Yes
Massachusetts (Buzzards Bay)	Massachusetts Maritime Academy		
Massachusetts (North Andover)	Merrimack College	School of Science and Engineering	
Massachusetts (Boston)	Northeastern University	College of Engineering	Yes
Massachusetts (Needham)	Franklin W. Olin College of Engineering		
Massachusetts (Northampton)	Smith College	Picker Engineering Program	
Massachusetts (Boston)	Suffolk University	College of Arts and Sciences, Engineering Department	
Massachusetts (Medford)	Tufts University	School of Engineering	Yes
Massachusetts (Amherst)	University of Massachusetts Amherst	College of Engineering	Yes
Massachusetts (Dartmouth)	University of Massachusetts Dartmouth	College of Engineering	Yes
Massachusetts (Lowell)	University of Massachusetts Lowell	James B. Francis College of Engineering	Yes
Massachusetts (Boston)	Wentworth Institute of Technology		
Massachusetts (Springfield)	Western New England University	College of Engineering	
Massachusetts (Worcester)	Worcester Polytechnic Institute		Yes
Michigan (Flint)	Baker College, Flint Campus		
Michigan (Grand Rapids)	Calvin University		
Michigan (Detroit)	Ferris State University	College of Engineering Technology	
Michigan (Allendale)	Grand Valley State University	School of Engineering	
Michigan (Holland)	Hope College		
Michigan (Flint)	Kettering University		
Michigan (Sault Ste. Marie)	Lake Superior State University	School of Engineering and Technology	
Michigan (Southfield)	Lawrence Technological University	College of Engineering	
Michigan (East Lansing)	Michigan State University	College of Engineering	Yes
Michigan (Houghton)	Michigan Technological University	College of Engineering	
Michigan (Rochester)	Oakland University	School of Engineering and Computer Science	
Michigan (Kochville Township)	Saginaw Valley State University	College of Science, Engineering, and Technology	
Michigan (Detroit)	University of Detroit Mercy	College of Engineering and Science	
Michigan (Ann Arbor)	University of Michigan	College of Engineering	Yes
Michigan (Dearborn)	University of Michigan–Dearborn	College of Engineering and Computer Science	
Michigan (Flint)	University of Michigan–Flint	College of Innovation and Technology	
Michigan (Detroit)	Wayne State University	College of Engineering	Yes
Michigan (Kalamazoo)	Western Michigan University	College of Engineering and Applied Sciences	
Minnesota (Mankato)	Minnesota State University, Mankato	College of Science, Engineering and Technology	Yes
Minnesota (St. Cloud)	St. Cloud State University	College of Science and Engineering	
Minnesota (Duluth)	University of Minnesota Duluth	Swenson College of Science and Engineering	Yes
Minnesota (Minneapolis)	University of Minnesota	College of Science and Engineering	Yes
Minnesota (St. Paul)	University of St. Thomas	School of Engineering	
Minnesota (Winona)	Winona State University	College of Science and Engineering	No
Mississippi (Starkville)	Mississippi State University	James Worth Bagley College of Engineering	Yes
Mississippi (Oxford)	University of Mississippi	School of Engineering	Yes
Missouri (Rolla)	Missouri University of Science and Technology	College of Engineering and Computing	Yes
Missouri (St. Louis)	Saint Louis University	Parks College of Engineering, Aviation and Technology	Yes
Missouri (Cape Girardeau)	Southeast Missouri State University	Department of Industrial and Engineering Technology	No
Missouri (Columbia)	University of Missouri	College of Engineering	Yes
Missouri (Kansas City)	University of Missouri, Kansas City	School of Computing and Engineering	Yes
Missouri (St. Louis)	University of Missouri–St. Louis	Joint Undergraduate Engineering Program	
Missouri (St. Louis)	Washington University in St. Louis	McKelvey School of Engineering	Yes
Montana (Helena)	Carroll College		
Montana (Bozeman)	Montana State University	College of Engineering	No
Montana (Butte)	Montana Tech of the University of Montana	School of Mines and Engineering	
Nebraska (Lincoln)	University of Nebraska–Lincoln	College of Engineering	Yes
Nevada (Las Vegas)	University of Nevada, Las Vegas	College of Engineering	Yes
Nevada (Reno)	University of Nevada, Reno	College of Engineering	Yes
New Hampshire (Hanover)	Dartmouth College	Thayer School of Engineering	Yes
New Hampshire (Manchester)	Southern New Hampshire University	College of Engineering, Technology and Aeronautics	No
New Hampshire (Durham)	University of New Hampshire	College of Engineering and Physical Sciences	Yes
New Jersey (Ewing Township)	The College of New Jersey	School of Engineering	No
New Jersey (Teaneck, Hackensack)	Fairleigh Dickinson University, Metropolitan Campus	Gildart Haase School of Computer Sciences and Engineering	
New Jersey (West Long Branch)	Monmouth University	School of Science	
New Jersey (Newark)	New Jersey Institute of Technology	Newark College of Engineering	
New Jersey (Princeton)	Princeton University	School of Engineering and Applied Science	Yes
New Jersey (Glassboro)	Rowan University	College of Engineering	
New Jersey (Piscataway)	Rutgers University	School of Engineering	Yes
New Jersey (Hoboken)	Stevens Institute of Technology	Charles V. Schaefer, Jr. School of Engineering and Science	Yes
New Mexico (Socorro)	New Mexico Institute of Mining and Technology		
New Mexico (Las Cruces)	New Mexico State University	College of Engineering	
New Mexico (Albuquerque)	University of New Mexico	School of Engineering	
New York (Alfred)	Alfred University	Inamori School of Engineering	
New York (New York)	City University of New York, City College of New York	Grove School of Engineering	
New York (Staten Island)	City University of New York, College of Staten Island	Department of Engineering Science and Physics	
New York (Potsdam)	Clarkson University	School of Engineering	
New York (New York)	Columbia University	School of Engineering and Applied Science	
New York (New York)	Cooper Union		
New York (Ithaca)	Cornell University	College of Engineering	
New York (Hempstead)	Hofstra University	Fred DeMatteis School of Engineering and Applied Science (SEAS), Department of Engineering	
New York (Bronx)	Manhattan University		
New York (New York, Old Westbury)	New York Institute of Technology	School of Engineering and Computing Sciences	
New York (New York)	New York University	Tandon School of Engineering	Yes
New York (Troy)	Rensselaer Polytechnic Institute	School of Engineering	Yes
New York (Rochester)	Rochester Institute of Technology	Kate Gleason College of Engineering	
New York (Binghamton)	Binghamton University	Thomas J. Watson School of Engineering and Applied Science	Yes
New York (Buffalo)	State University of New York at Buffalo	School of Engineering and Applied Sciences	
New York (New Paltz)	State University of New York at New Paltz	School of Science and Engineering	
New York (Stony Brook)	State University of New York at Stony Brook	College of Engineering and Applied Sciences	
New York (Syracuse)	State University of New York; College of Environmental Science and Forestry		
New York (Bronx)	State University of New York Maritime College		
New York (Syracuse)	Syracuse University	L.C. Smith College of Engineering and Computer Science	Yes
New York (Schenectady)	Union College		
New York (Kings Point)	United States Merchant Marine Academy	Engineering Department	
New York (West Point)	United States Military Academy		
New York (Rochester)	University of Rochester	College of Arts Sciences and Engineering	Yes
New York (Glen Cover)	Webb Institute		
North Carolina (Durham)	Duke University	Edmund T. Pratt Jr. School of Engineering	Yes
North Carolina (Greenville)	East Carolina University	College of Engineering and Technology	Yes
North Carolina (Greensboro)	North Carolina A&T State University	College of Engineering	Yes
North Carolina (Raleigh)	North Carolina State University	College of Engineering	Yes
North Carolina (Chapel Hill)	University of North Carolina at Chapel Hill	College of Arts and Sciences	Yes
North Carolina (Charlotte)	University of North Carolina at Charlotte	William States Lee College of Engineering	Yes
North Dakota (Fargo)	North Dakota State University	College of Engineering and Architecture	Yes
North Dakota (Grand Forks)	University of North Dakota	School of Engineering and Mines	Yes
Ohio (Cleveland)	Case Western Reserve University	Case School of Engineering	Yes
Ohio (Cedarville)	Cedarville University	Elmer W. Engstrom Department of Engineering and Computer Science	
Ohio (Wilberforce)	Central State University	College of Science and Engineering	
Ohio (Cleveland)	Cleveland State University	Washkewicz College of Engineering	
Ohio (Marietta)	Marietta College		
Ohio (Oxford)	Miami University	College of Engineering and Computing	Yes
Ohio (Ada)	Ohio Northern University	College of Engineering	
Ohio (Columbus)	Ohio State University	College of Engineering	Yes
Ohio (Athens)	Ohio University	Russ College of Engineering and Technology	Yes
Ohio (Akron)	University of Akron	College of Engineering	
Ohio (Cincinnati)	University of Cincinnati	College of Engineering and Applied Science	Yes
Ohio (Dayton)	University of Dayton	School of Engineering	
Ohio (Toledo)	University of Toledo	College of Engineering	
Ohio (Fairborn)	Wright State University	College of Engineering and Computer Science	
Ohio (Youngstown)	Youngstown State University	College of Science, Technology, Engineering, and Mathematics	
Oklahoma (Edmond)	Oklahoma Christian University		
Oklahoma (Stillwater)	Oklahoma State University–Stillwater	College of Engineering, Architecture, and Technology	
Oklahoma (Tulsa)	Oral Roberts University		
Oklahoma (Norman)	University of Oklahoma	College of Engineering	
Oklahoma (Tulsa)	University of Tulsa	College of Engineering and Natural Sciences	
Oregon (Newberg)	George Fox University		
Oregon (Klamath Falls)	Oregon Institute of Technology		
Oregon (Corvallis)	Oregon State University	College of Engineering	
Oregon (Portland)	Portland State University	Maseeh College of Engineering and Computer Science	
Oregon (Portland)	University of Portland	Donald P. Shiley School of Engineering	
Pennsylvania (Lewisburg)	Bucknell University	College of Engineering	
Pennsylvania (Pittsburgh)	Carnegie Mellon University	College of Engineering	Yes
Pennsylvania (Philadelphia)	Drexel University	College of Engineering	
Pennsylvania (Erie)	Gannon University	College of Engineering and Business	
Pennsylvania (Beaver Falls)	Geneva College		
Pennsylvania (Grove City)	Grove City College	Albert A. Hopeman, Jr. School of Science, Engineering and Mathematics	
Pennsylvania (Easton)	Lafayette College	Division of Engineering	
Pennsylvania (Bethlehem)	Lehigh University	P. C. Rossin College of Engineering and Applied Science	
Pennsylvania (Grantham)	Messiah University	Department of Engineering	
Pennsylvania (Erie)	Penn State Erie, The Behrend College	School of Engineering	
Pennsylvania (Harrisburg)	Penn State Harrisburg	School of Science, Engineering, and Technology	
Pennsylvania (University Park)	Pennsylvania State University	College of Engineering	Yes
Pennsylvania (Philadelphia)	Philadelphia University	School of Design and Engineering o	
Pennsylvania (Moon Township)	Robert Morris University	School of Engineering, Mathematics, and Science	
Pennsylvania (Swarthmore)	Swarthmore College		
Pennsylvania (Philadelphia)	Temple University	College of Engineering	Yes
Pennsylvania (Philadelphia)	University of Pennsylvania	School of Engineering and Applied Science	Yes
Pennsylvania (Pittsburgh)	University of Pittsburgh	Swanson School of Engineering	Yes
Pennsylvania (Radnor Township)	Villanova University	College of Engineering	Yes
Pennsylvania (Chester)	Widener University	School of Engineering	Yes
Pennsylvania (Wilkes-Barre)	Wilkes University		
Pennsylvania (York)	York College of Pennsylvania		
Puerto Rico (San Juan)	Polytechnic University of Puerto Rico		
Puerto Rico (Mayagüez)	University of Puerto Rico at Mayagüez	School of Engineering	
Puerto Rico (Gurabo)	University of Turabo		
Rhode Island (Providence)	Brown University	School of Engineering	Yes
Rhode Island (Bristol)	Roger Williams University	School of Engineering, Computing and Construction Management	No
Rhode Island (Kingston)	University of Rhode Island	College of Engineering	Yes
South Carolina (Charleston)	The Citadel, The Military College of South Carolina	School of Engineering	Yes
South Carolina (Clemson)	Clemson University	College of Engineering and Science	
South Carolina (Columbia)	University of South Carolina	College of Engineering and Computing	
South Dakota (Rapid City)	South Dakota School of Mines and Technology		
South Dakota (Brookings)	South Dakota State University	College of Engineering	
Tennessee (Dayton)	Bryan College	Vogel School of Engineering	
Tennessee (Memphis)	Christian Brothers University	School of Engineering	
Tennessee (Nashville)	Lipscomb University	Raymond B. Jones College of Engineering	
Tennessee (Nashville)	Tennessee State University	College of Engineering	
Tennessee (Cookeville)	Tennessee Technological University	College of Engineering	
Tennessee (Jackson)	Union University	Department of Engineering	
Tennessee (Memphis)	University of Memphis	Herff College of Engineering	
Tennessee (Chattanooga)	University of Tennessee at Chattanooga	College of Engineering and Computer Science	
Tennessee (Knoxville)	University of Tennessee at Knoxville	College of Engineering	Yes
Tennessee (Martin)	University of Tennessee at Martin	College of Engineering and Natural Sciences	
Tennessee (Nashville)	Vanderbilt University	School of Engineering	Yes
Texas (Waco)	Baylor University	School of Engineering and Computer Science	Yes
Texas (Commerce)	East Texas A&M University		Yes
Texas (Beaumont)	Lamar University	College of Engineering	Yes
Texas (Longview)	LeTourneau University	School of Engineering and Engineering Technology	
Texas (Prairie View)	Prairie View A&M University	Roy G. Perry College of Engineering	Yes
Texas (Houston)	Rice University	George R. Brown School of Engineering	Yes
Texas (Dallas)	Southern Methodist University	Bobby B. Lyle School of Engineering	Yes
Texas (San Antonio)	St. Mary's University	School of Science, Engineering and Technology	
Texas (Texas A&M - Texarkana)	Texas A&M Texarkana	CBET	
Texas (Stephenville)	Tarleton State University	College of Science and Technology; Department of Engineering and Physics	
Texas (College Station)	Texas A&M University	College of Engineering	Yes
Texas (Corpus Christi)	Texas A&M University-Corpus Christi	College of Science and Engineering	Yes
Texas (Galveston)	Texas A&M University at Galveston		
Texas (Kingsville)	Texas A&M University–Kingsville	Frank H. Dotterweich College of Engineering	Yes
Texas (Fort Worth)	Texas Christian University	College of Science and Engineering, Department of Engineering	Yes
Texas (Lubbock and Amarillo)	Texas Tech University	Whitacre College of Engineering	Yes
Texas (San Antonio)	Trinity University		
Texas (Houston)	University of Houston	Cullen College of Engineering	Yes
Texas (Pasadena)	University of Houston–Clear Lake	School of Science and Computer Engineering	
Texas (Denton)	University of North Texas	College of Engineering	
Texas (Arlington)	University of Texas at Arlington	College of Engineering	Yes
Texas (Austin)	University of Texas at Austin	Cockrell School of Engineering	
Texas (Dallas)	University of Texas at Dallas	Erik Jonsson School of Engineering and Computer Science	Yes
Texas (El Paso)	University of Texas at El Paso	College of Engineering	
Texas (Edinburg)	University of Texas–Pan American	College of Engineering and Computer Science	
Texas (San Antonio)	University of Texas at San Antonio	College of Engineering	Yes
Texas (Tyler)	University of Texas at Tyler	College of Engineering and Computer Science	Yes
Texas (Canyon)	West Texas A&M University	College of Agriculture, Science and Engineering, Department of Engineering and Computer Science	
Utah (Provo)	Brigham Young University	Ira A. Fulton College of Engineering and Technology	Yes
Utah (Cedar City)	Southern Utah University	College of Science and Engineering	
Utah (Salt Lake City)	University of Utah	College of Engineering	Yes
Utah (Logan)	Utah State University	College of Engineering	Yes
Vermont (Northfield)	Norwich University	David Crawford School of Engineering	
Vermont (Burlington)	University of Vermont	College of Engineering and Mathematical Sciences	Yes
Virginia (Newport News)	Christopher Newport University	College of Natural and Behavioral Sciences	
Virginia (Fairfax)	George Mason University	Volgenau School of Information Technology and Engineering	
Virginia (Hampton)	Hampton University	School of Engineering and Technology	
Virginia (Norfolk)	Old Dominion University	Frank Batten College of Engineering and Technology	
Virginia (Charlottesville)	University of Virginia	School of Engineering and Applied Science	
Virginia (Richmond)	Virginia Commonwealth University	School of Engineering	
Virginia (Lexington)	Virginia Military Institute		
Virginia (Blacksburg)	Virginia Polytechnic Institute and State University	College of Engineering	
Washington (Cheney)	Eastern Washington University	College of Science, Health and Engineering	
Washington (Spokane)	Gonzaga University	School of Engineering and Applied Science	
Washington (Lacey)	Saint Martin's University	School of Engineering	
Washington (Seattle)	Seattle Pacific University	College of Arts and Sciences	
Washington (Seattle)	Seattle University	College of Science and Engineering	
Washington (Seattle)	University of Washington	College of Engineering	
Washington (College Place)	Walla Walla University	Edward F. Cross School of Engineering	
Washington (Pullman)	Washington State University		
West Virginia (Huntington)	Marshall University	College of Information Technology and Engineering	
West Virginia (Morgantown)	West Virginia University	Benjamin M. Statler College of Engineering and Mineral Resources	Yes
West Virginia (Beckley)	West Virginia University Institute of Technology	Leonard C. Nelson College of Engineering and Sciences	
Wisconsin (La Crosse)	Viterbo University		
Wisconsin (Marquette)	Marquette University	College of Engineering	Yes
Wisconsin (Milwaukee)	Milwaukee School of Engineering	School of Engineering	Yes
Wisconsin (Madison)	University of Wisconsin–Madison	College of Engineering	Yes
Wisconsin (Milwaukee)	University of Wisconsin–Milwaukee	College of Engineering and Applied Science	Yes
Wisconsin (Platteville)	University of Wisconsin–Platteville		
Wisconsin (Menomonie)	University of Wisconsin–Stout	College of Science, Technology, Engineering and Mathematics	
Wyoming (Laramie)	University of Wyoming	College of Engineering and Applied Science	Yes

== Uzbekistan ==
- Turin Polytechnic University in Tashkent
- Tashkent State Technical University
- Tashkent Institute of Irrigation and Melioration
- Tashkent Automobile and Road Construction Institute

== See also ==
- List of engineering branches
- List of engineering journals and magazines
- Lists of engineering software
