= Pierre Cossette =

Pierre Cossette may refer to:

- Pierre Cossette (producer)
- Pierre Cossette (physician)
