= University of Georgia College of Engineering =

Coordinates: 33.93891°N 83.37491°W

- Type: Public
- Established: 2012
- Dean: Alessandro "Alex" Orso
- Faculty: 120
- Students: 3,000+
- Location: Athens, Georgia, U.S.
- Website: www.engineering.uga.edu

The University of Georgia College of Engineering is a public engineering college within the University of Georgia (UGA) in Athens, Georgia. Established in 2012, the college enrolls more than 3,000 undergraduate and graduate students as of fall 2024 and has 120 faculty members.

== Overview ==
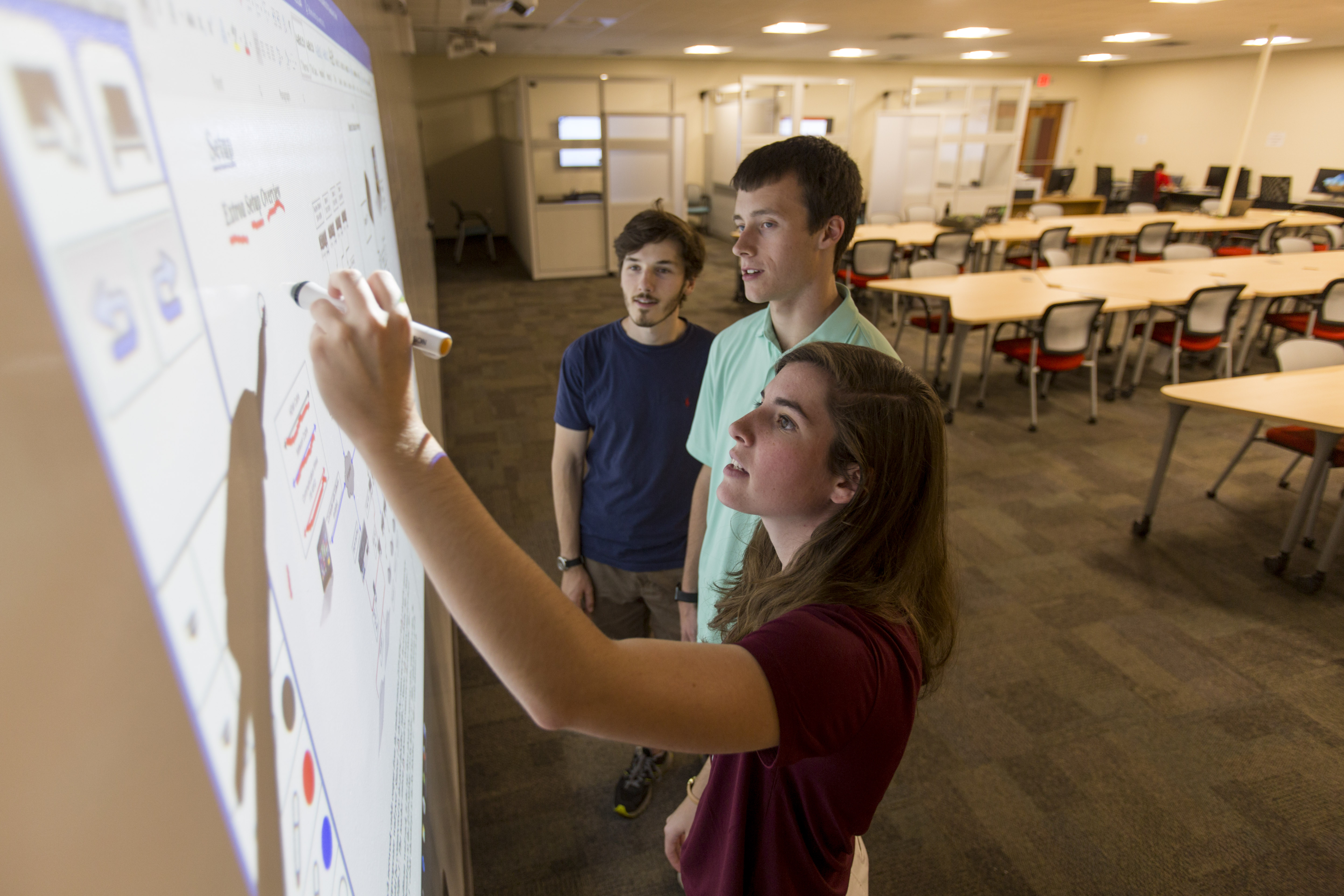
The Collaborative Design and Integration Studio (CDIS) features flexible work areas and high-end technology for students to work in teams on complex projects.

Although engineering has been taught at UGA since 1844, the formal College of Engineering was not established until 2012. Donald J. Leo served as dean from 2013, a year after the college was established; enrollment grew from fewer than 1,000 students to more than 2,800 during his tenure. In May 2024, Leo was named executive vice president and provost at Ohio University and left UGA on July 1, 2024. Stephan Durham served as interim dean from June 1, 2024. Following a nationwide search, Alessandro "Alex" Orso was appointed dean effective July 1, 2025.

In fiscal year 2025, research expenditures totaled $17.82 million, up 14.5 percent from the previous year.

== Undergraduate Degrees Available ==
- BS Agricultural Engineering
- BS Biochemical Engineering
- BS Biological Engineering
- BS Civil Engineering
- BS Computer Systems Engineering
- BS Electrical and Electronics Engineering
- BS Environmental Engineering
- BS Mechanical Engineering
- Undergraduate Certificate in Aerospace Engineering
- Undergraduate Certificate in Coastal & Oceanographic Engineering

== Graduate Degrees Available ==
- Masters in Biochemical Engineering
- Masters in Biological Engineering
- Masters in Biomanufacturing and Bioprocessing
- Masters in Engineering
- Masters in Agricultural Engineering
- Masters in Civil and Environmental Engineering
- Online M.S. in Civil Engineering
- Ph.D. in Engineering
- Ph.D. in Biochemical Engineering
- Ph.D. in Biological & Agricultural Engineering
- Ph.D. in Biomedical Engineering
- Ph.D. in Civil and Environmental Engineering
- Ph.D. in Mechanical Engineering
