= Pierre Cossette (physician) =

Canadian physician and academic administrator

Pierre Cossette FRCPC
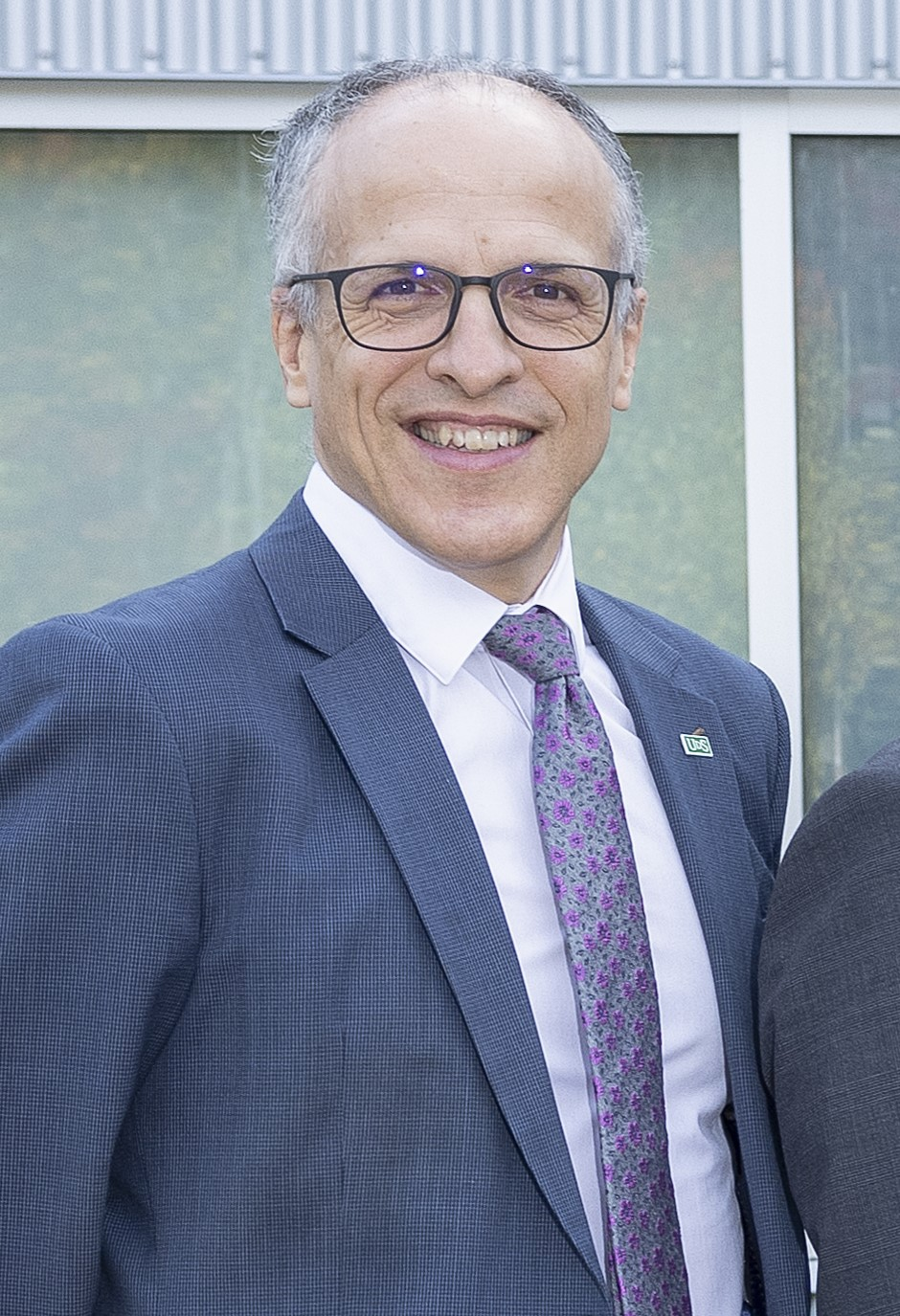
- Cossette in 2022
- Born: Saint-Hyacinthe, Quebec, Canada
- Education: Université de Montréal, Université de Sherbrooke, McGill University
- Occupation: Internist

Pierre Cossette (born September 18, 1967 in Saint-Hyacinthe, Quebec) is a Canadian physician, university professor, and academic administrator. In 2017, he was named the 10th rector of Université de Sherbrooke.

== Early life and education ==
Cossette obtained his Doctor of Medicine degree from Université de Montréal in 1991. He then completed four years of residency training in internal medicine at Université de Sherbrooke until 1995. In 1999, he obtained a Master of Science degree in epidemiology and biostatistics from McGill University.

== Career ==
His university teaching career began in 1997 at Université de Sherbrooke. From 1998 to 2004, he was the residency program director for internal medicine at Université de Sherbrooke. In 2004, he was appointed director of both the Department of Medicine of the Centre hospitalier universitaire de Sherbrooke (CHUS) and the Faculté de médecine et des sciences de la santé (FMSS) of the Université de Sherbrooke. His term ended in September 2010 when he was appointed Dean of the Faculté de médecine et des sciences de la santé at Université de Sherbrooke. In June 2017, his appointment as Dean ended as he became the 10th rector of the Université de Sherbrooke, succeeding Luce Samoisette. His first mandate as rector has a duration of five years.

Cossette also presided over the Réseau universitaire intégré de santé (RUIS) de Sherbrooke from 2012 to 2016.
