= Université de Sherbrooke =

University in Sherbrooke, Quebec, Canada

- University of Sherbrooke (English)
- Motto: Veritatem in charitate
- Motto in English: Truth In Charity
- Type: Public
- Established: 1954
- Affiliations: AUCC, CARL, CBIE, IAU, CUSID
- Rector: Jean-Pierre Perreault
- Faculty: 3,400
- Administrative staff: 3,200
- Students: 31,000
- Location: Sherbrooke and Longueuil, Quebec, Canada; 45°22′45.86″N 71°55′39.58″W
- Campus: Urban/Suburban
- Language: French
- Sports teams: Sherbrooke Vert-et-Or ('Sherbrooke Green-and-Gold')
- Colours: Green and Gold
- Sporting affiliations: QSSF
- Website: usherbrooke.ca

The Université de Sherbrooke (UdeS; English: University of Sherbrooke) is a French-language public research university in Sherbrooke, Quebec, Canada, with a second campus in Longueuil, a suburb on the South Shore of Montreal. It is one of two universities in the Estrie region of Quebec (the other one being Bishop's University), and the only French-language university for the region.

As of 2022, the Université de Sherbrooke is home to 31,000 students, and an additional 3,000 older learners (age 50+) in continuing education in its "University of the Third Age". Of its 7,400 employees, about 4,000 are teaching staff. The university has over 100,000 graduates and offers 46 undergraduate, 48 master's and 27 doctoral programs. It holds a total of 61 research chairs, among which are the pharmacology, microelectronics, statistical learning, and environment research chairs.

== Campus ==
The Université de Sherbrooke has five campuses:

- The Main Sherbrooke Campus
- The Sherbrooke Health Campus
- The Longueuil Campus
- The Joint Campus in Saguenay (on the site of the Université du Québec à Chicoutimi)
- The Joint Campus in Moncton (on the site of the Université de Moncton, in Moncton, New Brunswick).

== History ==
The Université de Sherbrooke was established in 1954 as a French-speaking Catholic university in a region that had historically been English speaking, the Estrie, or Eastern Townships in English. The only university in this region for over 100 years was the English-based Anglican Bishop's University. The Roman Catholic Church created this university in an effort to provide a more convenient education for the Catholic and French speakers in the region. Initially there was a religious component to the pedagogical activities, but by the end of the 1960s the number of priests working for the university had greatly diminished during the Quiet Revolution. In 1975, the appointment of a layman as Rector marked the end of religious activity in the institution.

In 1991, the campus in Longueuil was opened, located adjacent to the Longueuil Metro station and the Jacques-Cartier Bridge.

Université de Sherbrooke's arms, supporters, flag, and badge were registered with the Canadian Heraldic Authority on January 15, 2004. Université de Sherbrooke's crest and Supporters were registered with the Canadian Heraldic Authority on April 20, 2007. The motto of the school is Veritatem in Charitate ("Truth through charity").

In 2006, the university opened a branch of its medical facility on the campus of UQAC, where its students enrol for medical courses. This was subsequently followed by a similar branch on the campus of the Universite de Moncton in New Brunswick.

The number of students attending the Université de Sherbrooke continues to rise and the university has worked with the City of Sherbrooke to respond to the increase. Activities at the Université de Sherbrooke are mainly centred on teaching and research.

== Rectors ==
- 2025–present: Jean-Pierre Perreault
- 2017–2025: Pierre Cossette
- 2009–2017: Luce Samoisette
- 2001–2009: Bruno-Marie Béchard Marinier
- 1993–2001: Pierre Reid
- 1985–1993: Aldée Cabana
- 1981–1985: Claude Hamel
- 1975–1981: Yves Martin
- 1965–1975: Roger Maltais
- 1955–1965: Irénée Pinard
- 1954–1955: Maurice Vincent

== Institutions ==
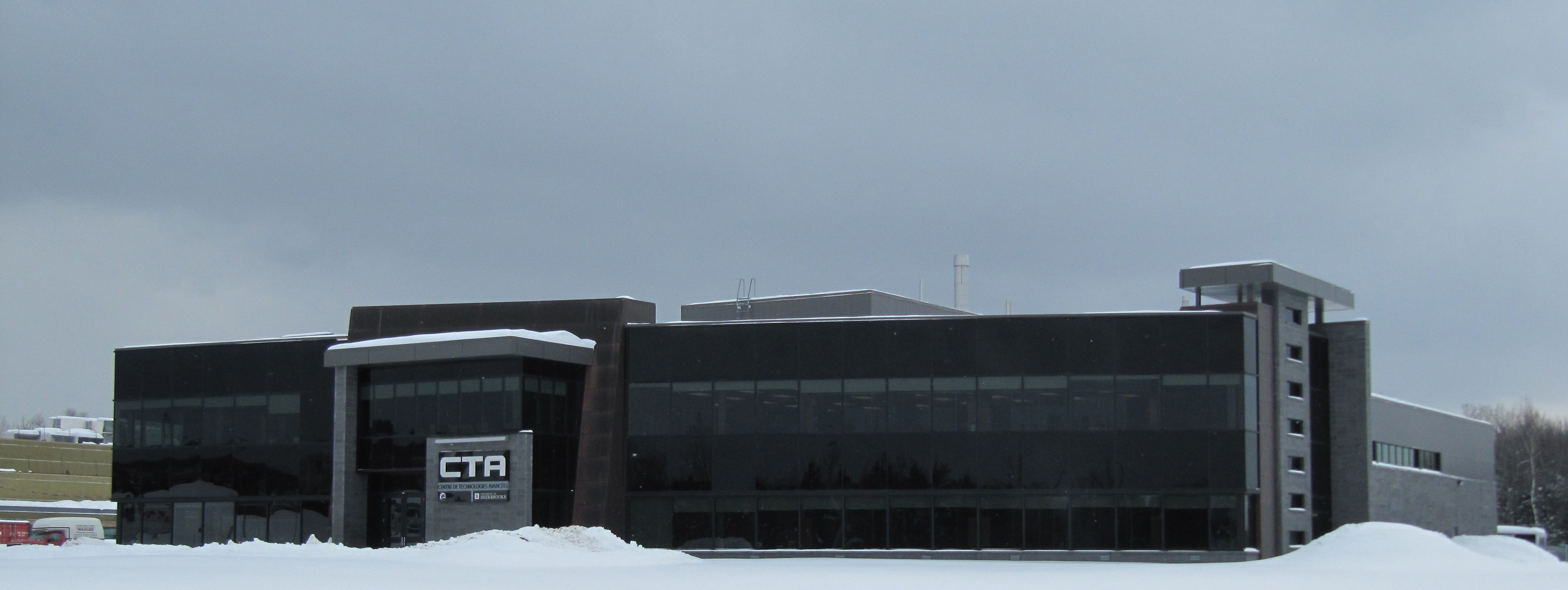
Centre des technologies avancées BRP - Université de Sherbrooke

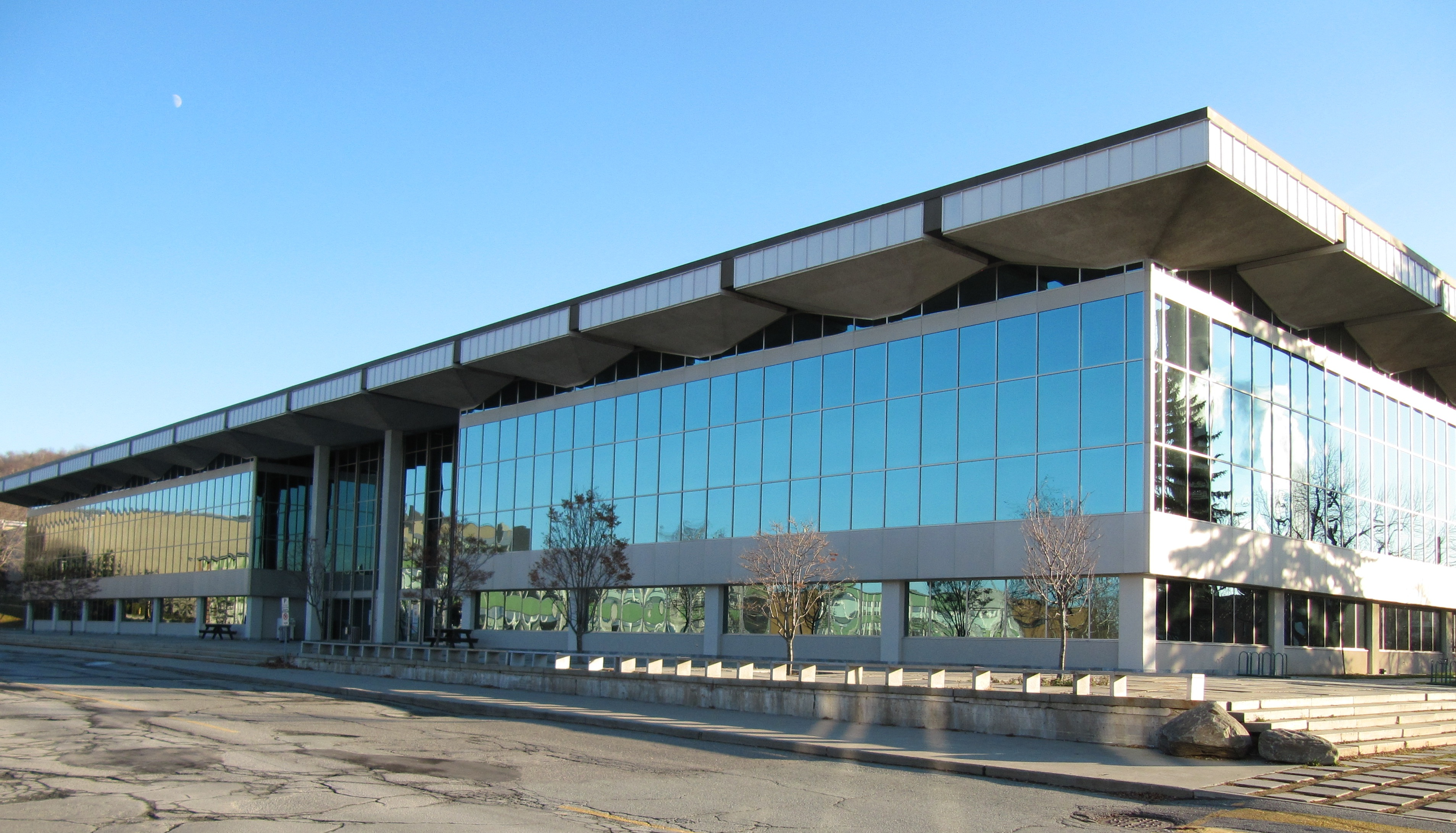
George-Cabana Pavilion

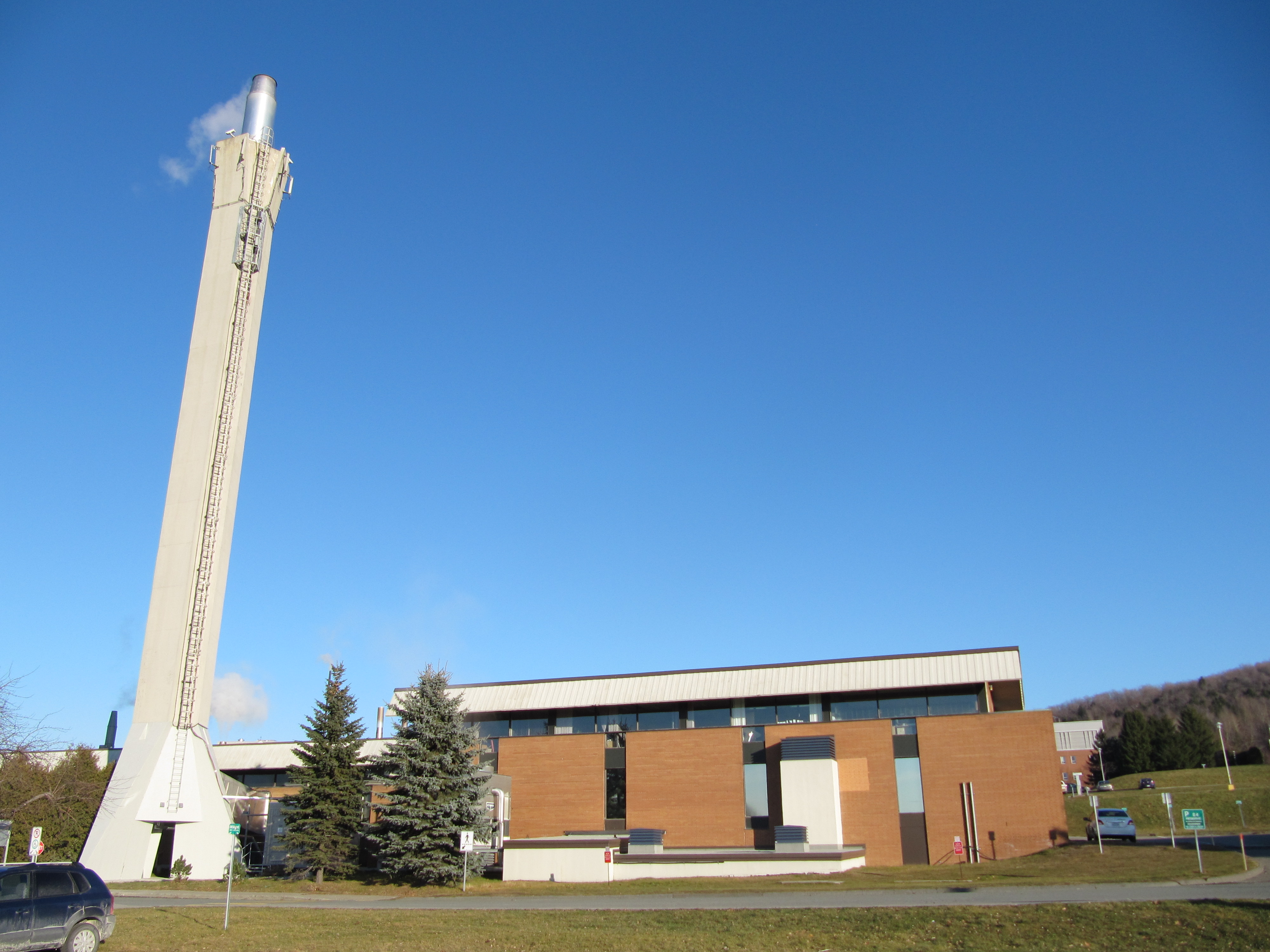
Energy central

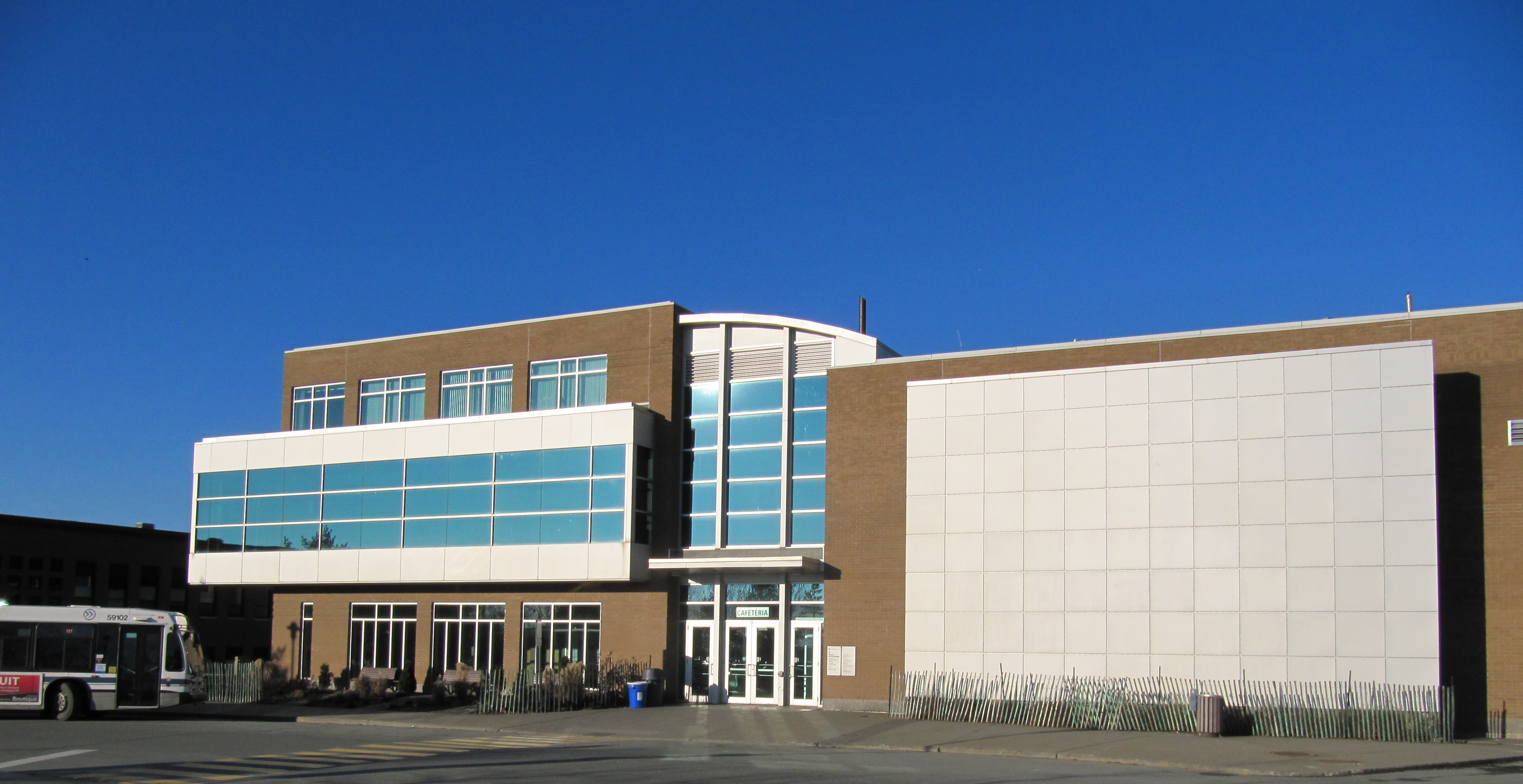
Multifunctional Pavilion

The Université de Sherbrooke is composed of the following faculties:

1. Faculty of Administration
2. Faculty of Education
3. Faculty of Engineering
4. Faculty of Law
5. Faculty of Letters and Humanities
6. Faculty of Medicine and Health Sciences
7. Faculty of Sports and Physical Education
8. Faculty of Science
9. Faculty of Theology, Ethics and Philosophy

The Main Sherbrooke Campus includes:

- Administration
- Support services
- Most faculties
- The George-Cabana Pavilion (central pavilion)
- The Multifunctional Pavilion
- The Univestrie Pavilion (sports centre)
- The Cultural Centre and Maurice-O'Bready Theatre
- The Humanities Library
- The Law and Government Publications Library
- The Music Library
- The Science and Engineering Library
- The Documentation Centre
- The Anne-Hébert Centre
- The Pedagogical Resource Centre
- The Jean-Marie Roy Map Library
- Student residences

The Sherbrooke Health Campus includes:

- The Faculty of Medicine and Health Sciences
- The Institute of Pharmacology of Sherbrooke
- The Sherbrooke University Hospital
- The Centre for Clinical Research
- The Biotechnology Research Centre in Estrie
- The Gérald-La Salle Pavilion
- The Health Sciences Library
- The Pavillon de Recherche Appliquée sur le Cancer (PRAC)
- A sports centre
- Student residences

The Longueuil Campus was founded in 1989. Today it offers more than 90 educational programs, primarily at the master's level, in eight of the nine faculties of the university (Administration; Education; Engineering; Law; Letters and Humanities; Medicine and Health Sciences; Science; Theology, Ethics and Philosophy). Whether at the undergraduate or graduate level, most programs are offered on a part-time basis on evenings and weekends, or in various intensive formats to allow professionals to remain in the work force.

The Longueuil Campus hosts the applied research projects of its faculties along with others conducted in collaboration with Charles LeMoyne Hospital, an affiliated regional and university centre located in the Montérégie region. The campus is located on Montreal's South Shore across from the Longueuil-Université-de-Sherbrooke metro station.

The Joint Campus in Saguenay opened its doors in 1996 to medical students.

Also opening in 1996, the Joint Campus in Moncton, New Brunswick, offers medical training to French-speaking students.

== Programs ==
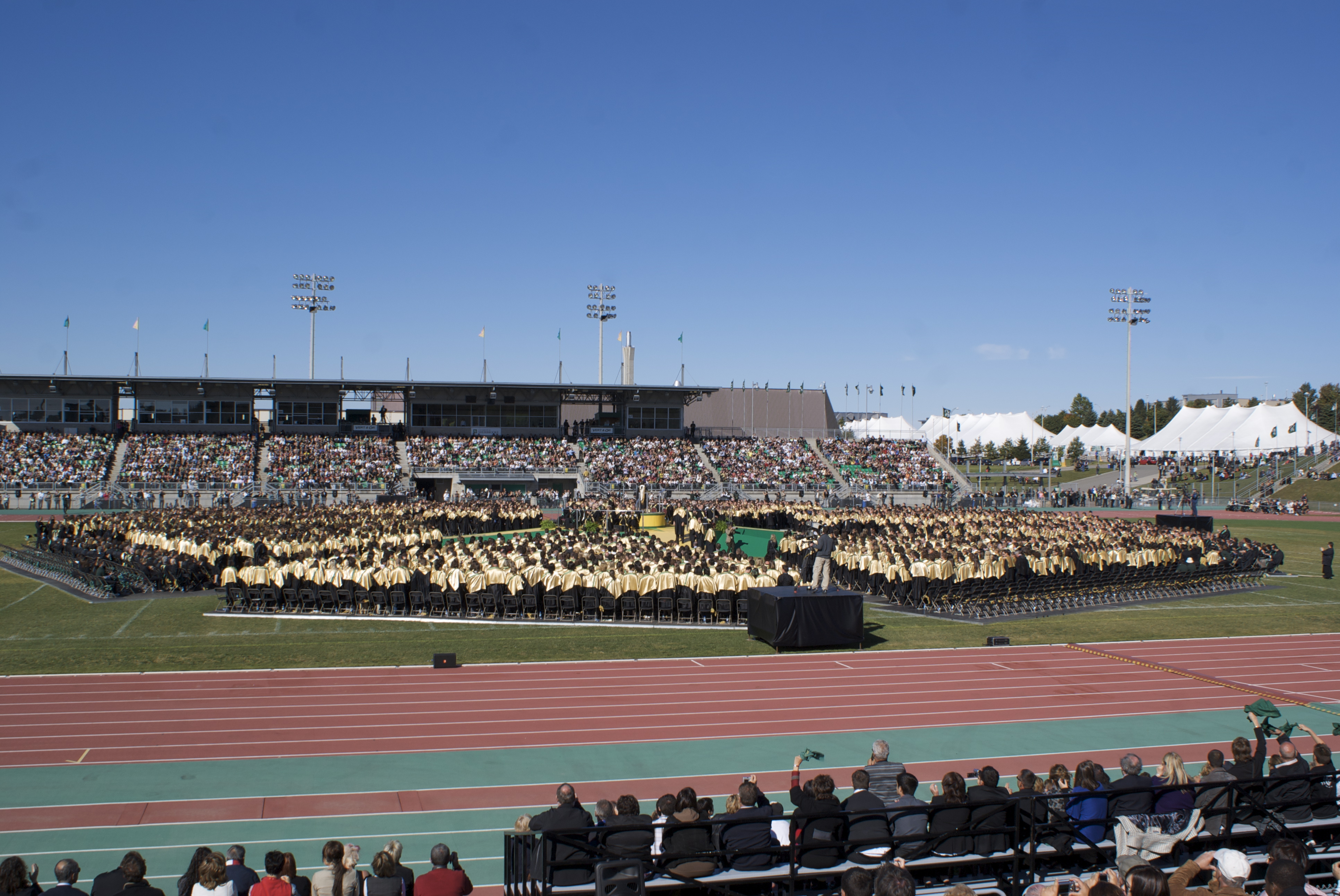
Graduation ceremonies at Université de Sherbrooke

The university offers a variety of bachelors, masters, doctoral and post-doctoral programs as well as various certificates and microprograms.

The Faculty of Theology, Ethics and Philosophy offers Undergraduate level certificate, diploma, Bachelors, Masters and Doctorate degrees in Theology/Theological Studies; Doctorate Theology and Religious Vocations; and Undergraduate level certificate/diploma/Graduate level certificate/diploma Pastoral Studies/Counselling.

The Faculty of Engineering offers courses in the following specialties: Chemical Engineering, Civil Engineering, Electrical Engineering, Computer Engineering, Biotechnology Engineering, Robotics Engineering, Building Engineering and Mechanical Engineering.

== Sports ==
Sports teams representing the Université de Sherbrooke are called Le Vert & Or (called The Green and Gold in English).

== Media ==
The university publishes the magazine UdeS, which has a circulation of 85,000 copies. Published three times a year by the Communications Service, this magazine is distributed free to everyone in the central graduate database and to staff as well as friends of the institution. Copies are also distributed in a number of locations in Sherbrooke.

The university's student community puts out a student newspaper, the Collectif, and operates an FM radio station, CFAK-FM.

== Rankings and reputation ==
University rankings

World rankings
- ARWU World: 601–700
- QS World: 901-950
- USNWR World: 789
- 21–22

Canadian rankings
- QS National: 26–27
- USNWR National: 24
- Maclean's Medical/Doctoral: 14
- Maclean's Reputation: 20

Université de Sherbrooke has placed in several international post-secondary school rankings. In the 2022 Academic Ranking of World Universities rankings, the university ranked 501–600 in the world. The 2023 QS World University Rankings ranked the university 751–800 in the world and 24–26 in Canada. In U.S. News & World Report 2022–23 global university rankings, the university placed 789th.

The university has also placed in post-secondary national rankings, including the 2023 rankings published by Maclean's, which ranked Sherbrooke 15th in their Medical-Doctoral university category, and 20th in their reputation ranking for Canadian universities.

== Associations and student groups ==
There are many associations and student groups at the University of Sherbrooke.

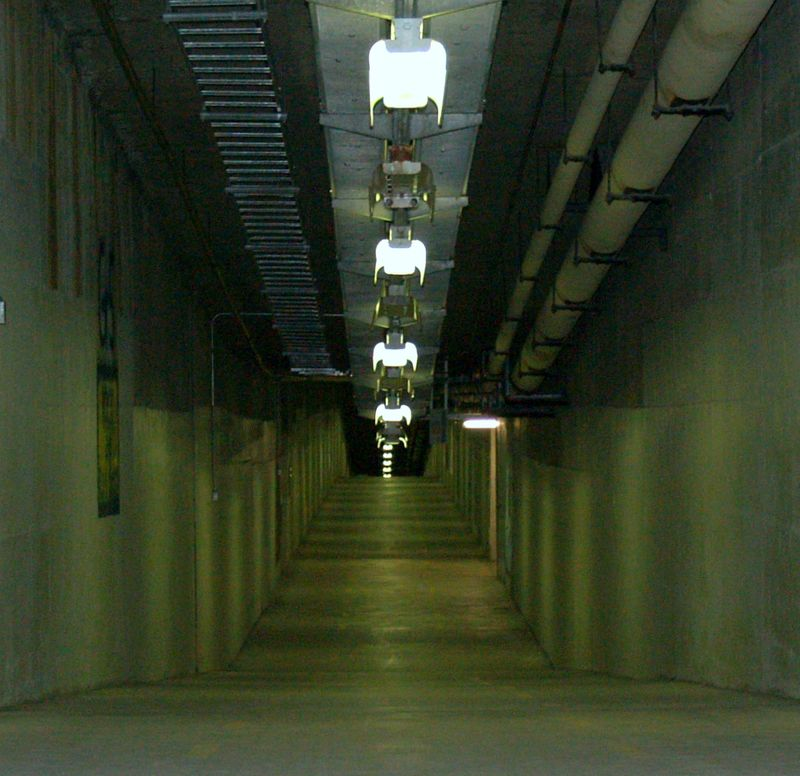
Tunnel at Université de Sherbrooke

ADEEP

L'association des étudiantes et étudiants en pharmacologie is a group for the pharmacology students, founded in 2007.

FEUS

Founded in 1955, the Fédération étudiante de l’Université de Sherbrooke represents all undergraduate students in the university. With 10 member associations and over 13,000 student members, it is one of the most important lobby groups in the Estrie region. It is a member of several external organizations, having formerly been affiliated with the Fédération étudiante universitaire du Québec (FEUQ), the Quebec Federation of University Students. As of 2016, it is not part of a province wide student organisation.

AGEFLESH

Founded in 1993, the Association générale des étudiants de la Faculté des lettres et sciences humaines de l’Université de Sherbrooke represents students in the Faculty of Letters and Humanities. It participated in the student strike movement against the $103 million in cuts to student financial assistance in the spring of 2005.

Since 2005, when it was accredited as sole representative of all students in the faculty, the association has fought against the monopoly held by a food-distribution company on the Sherbrooke Main Campus. It is preparing a business plan to set up a student cooperative cafe in the faculty.

- AGEEMUS: Founded in 1969, the Association générale des étudiants en médecine de l’Université de Sherbrooke represents medical students attending the university's various satellite campuses (Longueuil, Chicoutimi, Moncton).
- AGED: The Association générale étudiante de droit of the Université de Sherbrooke represents students in the Faculty of Law.
- AGEG: The Association générale des étudiants de génie of the Université de Sherbrooke represents students in the Faculty of Engineering.
- AGER: The Association générale des étudiants de réadaptation of the Université de Sherbrooke represents undergraduates in occupational therapy and physiotherapy.
- AETEP: The Association des étudiants en théologie, éthique et philosophie of the Université de Sherbrooke represents students in the Faculty of Theology, Ethics and Philosophy.
- AGES: Founded in 1959, the Association générale des étudiants en sciences of the Université de Sherbrooke represents students in the Faculty of Science. On March 17, 2010, the AGES won the Continuity Prize awarded by the FEUS at the Défi Étudiant for their 51 years of service.
- AGEEFEUS: The Association générale des étudiants de la Faculté d'éducation de l’Université de Sherbrooke represents undergraduate students in the Faculty of Education and is a member of FEUS.
- AGEMDEUS: The Association générale des étudiants de la maîtrise et du doctorat de la Faculté d'éducation de l’Université de Sherbrooke represents graduate students in the Faculty of Education. AGEMDEUS has over 400 members and is a member of REMDUS.
- AEFA: The Association des étudiants de la Faculté d'administration of the Université de Sherbrooke represents students in the Faculty of Administration. This group is also an umbrella organisation for some of the other student associations. The COMITÉ CA represents people studying to be a Chartered Accountant. The COMITÉ CMA is represents Chartered Management Accountant students, and the COMITÉ CGA represents students taking a GCA degree.
- FONDS ÉQUINOX represents students in finance. The people in Marketing are represented by the student association Markus. The human resources students have a group named GERHUS. RÉGIS is the association for people studying in managing information systems.
- AGEESIUS: The Association des étudiants en science infirmière de l’Université de Sherbrooke represents students in nursing science.
- AGEEP: The Association des étudiants en éducation physique of the Université de Sherbrooke represents students in the Faculty of Sports and Physical Education.
- RECMUS: Regroupement des étudiants chercheurs en médecine de l'Université de Sherbrooke is a group for medical students.
- RECPUS: The Regroupement des étudiants chercheurs en pharmacologie de l’Université de Sherbrooke represents pharmacology research students.
- RECSEP: The Regroupement des étudiants de cycles supérieurs en études politiques represents political science students.
- RECSUS: The Regroupement étudiant des chercheurs et chercheuses en sciences de l'Université de Sherbrooke represents graduate students from the Faculty of Sciences.
- REMDUS: The Regroupement des étudiants en maîtrise et doctorat de l’Université de Sherbrooke represents all of the university's graduate students. It is affiliated with FEUQ, the Quebec Federation of University Students.
- GCIUS : Dans les associations de l’Université de Sherbrooke, il y a le GCIUS qui est un groupe de coopération internationale.

== Notable faculty ==
- Esteban Chornet, professor of chemical engineering, entrepreneur, and inventor; 2004 recipient of the Prix Lionel-Boulet
- Pierre Deslongchamps, professor emeritus and organic chemist
- Micheline Dumont (historian) (born 1935), historian, professor emeritus
- André Lussier, professor emeritus and pioneer of clinical rheumatology in Canada.
- Gilles Pigeon, former Dean of Medicine, 1991 recipient of the Duncan-Graham Award of the Royal College of Physicians and Surgeons of Canada, Officer of the National Order of Quebec and of the Ordre des Palmes académiques
- Ouida Ramón-Moliner, anaesthetist
- Louis Taillefer, professor of physics, Canada Research Chair in Quantum Materials, 2011 recipient of the Order of Canada
- Charles Thiffault (born 1939), NHL ice hockey coach

== Notable alumni ==
- Aziz Akhannouch, businessman and prime minister of Morocco
- Laurent Beaudoin, chairman of the board of directors of Bombardier.
- Jean-Christophe Beaulieu, Canadian football player
- Élisabeth Brière, member of Parliament
- Liu Chao-shiuan, prime minister of Taiwan
- Jean Charest, Quebec premier and deputy prime minister of Canada
- Martin Coiteux, president of the council of treasury of Quebec under the government of Philippe Couillard
- Monique Desroches, ethnomusicologist
- Moulay Hafid Elalamy, Moroccan politician, Chairman of Teleperformance and Saham Bank
- Valérie Harvey, writer and sociologist
- Pierre-Marc Johnson, Quebec premier
- Simon Jolin-Barrette, Quebec minister of Justice and French Language
- Louis Lagassé, notary
- Camille Leblanc-Bazinet, Fittest Woman on Earth, 2014 Reebok Crossfit Games
- Marc Nadon, supernumerary judge and former Supreme Court nominee
- Anne Monique Nuyt, paediatrics researcher
- Charles Sirois, businessman

== Commemorative stamp ==
On 4 May 2004 Canada Post issued 'Sherbrooke University, 1954-2004 / Université de Sherbrooke, 1954-2004' as part of the Canadian Universities series. The stamp was based on a design by Denis L'Allier and on a photograph by Guy Lavigueur. The 49¢ stamps are perforated 13.5 and were printed by Canadian Bank Note Company.

== See also ==
- Bishop's University
- List of Quebec universities
- Higher education in Quebec
- Canadian Interuniversity Sport
- Canadian government scientific research organizations
- Canadian university scientific research organizations
- Canadian industrial research and development organizations
