= Silliman University College of Engineering and Design =

The Silliman University College of Engineering and Design is one of the constituent colleges of Silliman University, a private research university in Dumaguete, Philippines. The college started as the Department of Engineering in 1932, then offering a single course in Civil Engineering. By the time Silliman acquired university status, Silliman proceeded to provide additional undergraduate programs. At present, the college provides undergraduate courses in Civil Engineering, Mechanical Engineering, Electrical Engineering, Computer Engineering, and Architecture. It is currently housed in three buildings, referred to as the Engineering Complex composed of Calderon Hall, Uytengsu Hall, and Batchelor Hall.
