= Faculty of Engineering at the Université de Sherbrooke =

Coordinates: 45.3784°N 71.9258°W

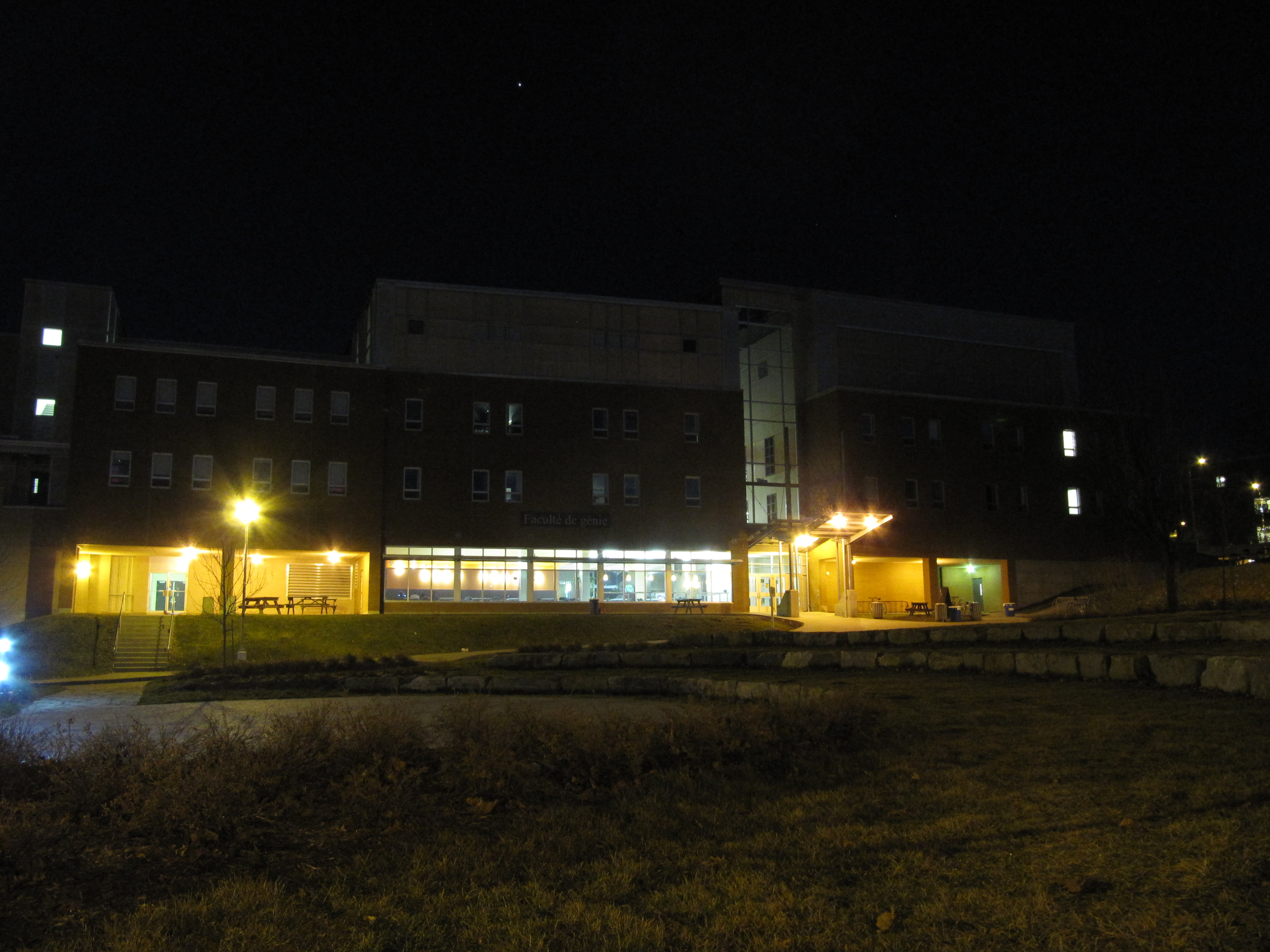
Faculty building.

Faculty of Engineering at the Université de Sherbrooke (French: Faculté de génie de l'Université de Sherbrooke) is Université de Sherbrooke's engineering school. It is located on the university's main campus in Sherbrooke, Quebec and was founded in 1954. On its 50th anniversary a time capsule and a counter were introduced in the main hall. The time capsule will be opened in the year 2054 for the faculty's 100th anniversary.

All of the faculty's programs are offered in co-op, which gives the students work experience and money to pursue their studies.

Since 2001, Electrical and Computer Engineering department have been experimenting with new methods of education.

The Faculty also offers a Biotechnological Engineering degree, a first of its kind in Canada. Students enrolled in this program receive both Chemical Engineering and Biology courses. The program focuses mainly on Bioprocess Engineering (cell culture, purification, design, etc.). The teaching language is French.

== Undergraduate programs ==
- Biotechnological Engineering
- Building Engineering
- Chemical Engineering
- Civil Engineering
- Computer Engineering
- Electrical Engineering
- Mechanical Engineering
- Robotic Engineering
