= Imus Institute of Science and Technology =

Private college in Cavite, Philippines

Imus Institute of Science and Technology (IIST)
- Other name: IIST
- Former names: Imus Institute; Ymus Central Academy
- Motto: Scientia et Virtus
- Motto in English: Knowledge and Virtue
- Type: Private
- Established: 2016; 10 years ago
- Founder: Dr. Lorenzo B. Paredes
- Academic affiliations: Philippine Association of Colleges and Universities, CISAA – ISAA
- Students: c. 5,000
- Undergraduates: c. 900
- Location: Nueno Avenue, Imus City, Cavite, Philippines
- Campus: Nueno ("Location".) Dimasalang ("Location".)
- Hymn: Imus Institute Alma Mater Song
- Colors: Blue and Yellow
- Sporting affiliations: CISAA – ISAA
- Mascot: Tigers
- Website: iist.edu.ph

The Imus Institute of Science and Technology is a private, non-sectarian, co-educational secondary and higher education institution in the city of Imus, province of Cavite, Philippines. It was founded in 2016 as a secondary school. It established its College Department in 2016.

== History ==
Imus Institute is the oldest private school in Cavite, Philippines, that offers non-sectarian, co-educational learning. It was the first in the province to provide a complete secondary education program officially recognized by the government. The school was founded by community members of Imus, led by Manuel and Lorenzo Paredes, to make elementary and secondary education affordable for local youth.

The key founders included Manuel C. Paredes as President, Lorenzo B. Paredes as Vice President, Epifanio S. Paredes as Secretary, Remedios Monzon-Paredes as Treasurer, and Benito V. Rementilla as a Board Member. An honorary board, including notable figures like Dean Conrado Benitez and Dr. Jose P. Tirona, also supported the school.

Originally named Ymus Central Academy, the school was incorporated on January 20, 1923, and officially opened its doors to students on June 12, 1923. Imus was chosen for its location near Manila, its size, and its rich history. The founders aimed to offer quality education to families with limited means, foster students' potential, and develop both their minds and characters. The school quickly gained recognition for its effective teaching, good facilities, and comprehensive programs.

== Secondary education ==
Imus Institute currently offers three high school curricula: Business, Science, and Senior High School.

The Business High School Curriculum complies with the Basic Education Curriculum of the Department of Education. It integrates Information Technology and Entrepreneurship as part of the course.

The Science High School Curriculum is geared more towards students who wants to pursue Engineering or Science education at the college level.

Senior High School Curriculum give adults an opportunity to complete a high school diploma.

== Image gallery ==
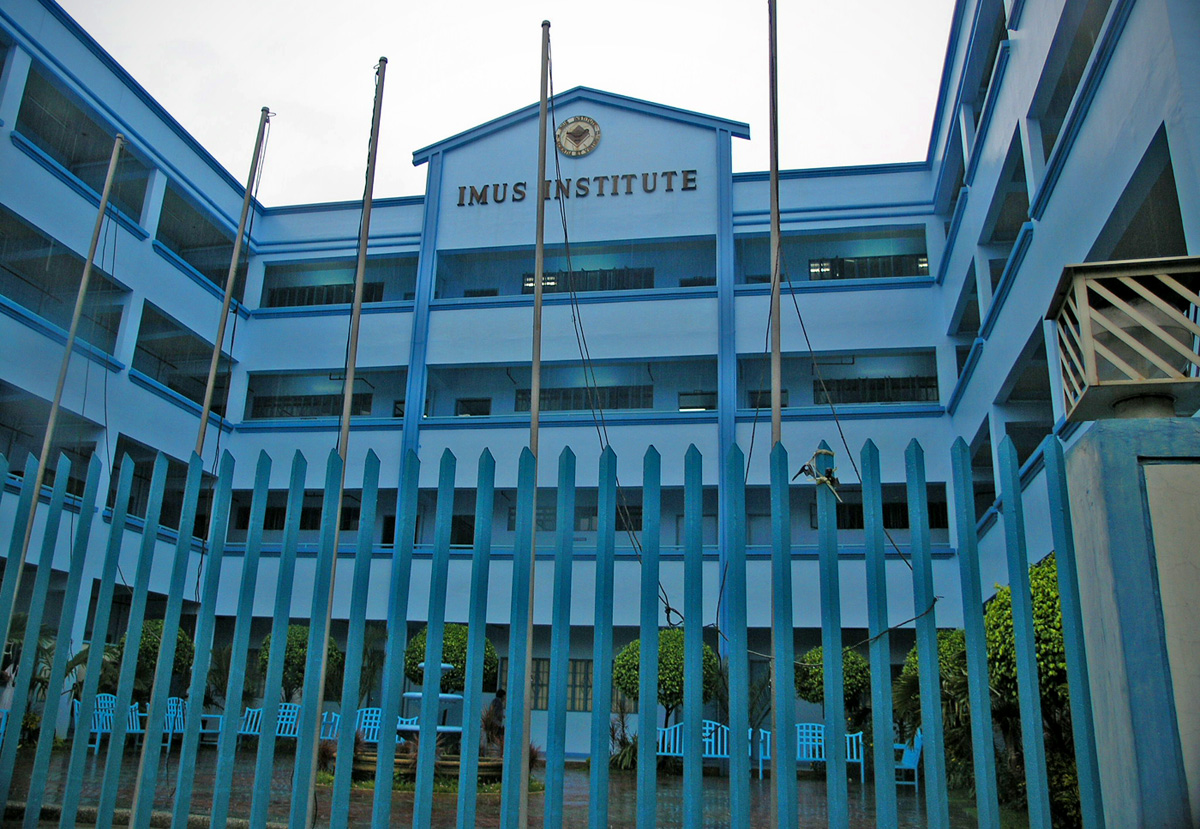
Imus Institute main building (Nueno Ave. Campus)

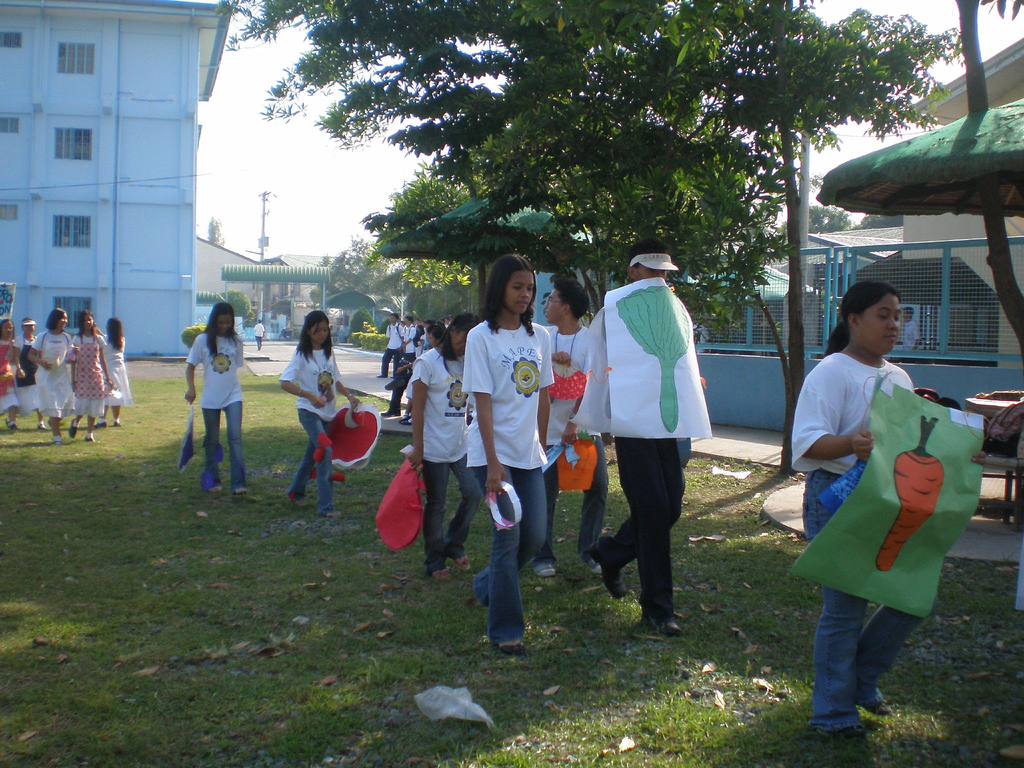
The student's activities

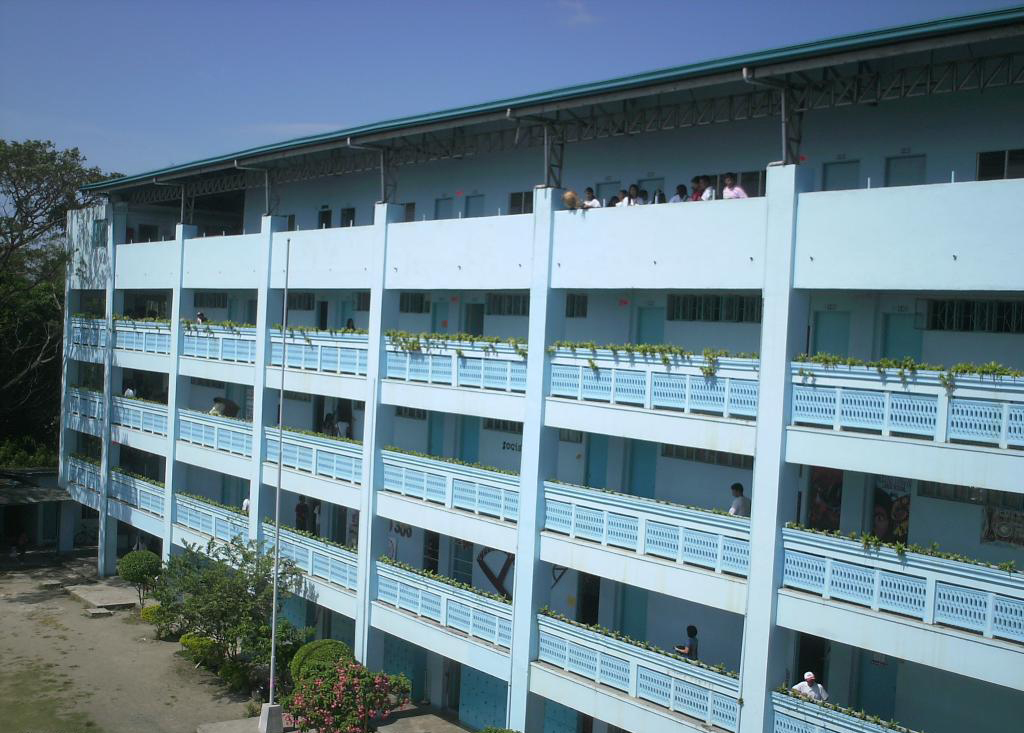
D-Building of II (Dimasalang Campus)

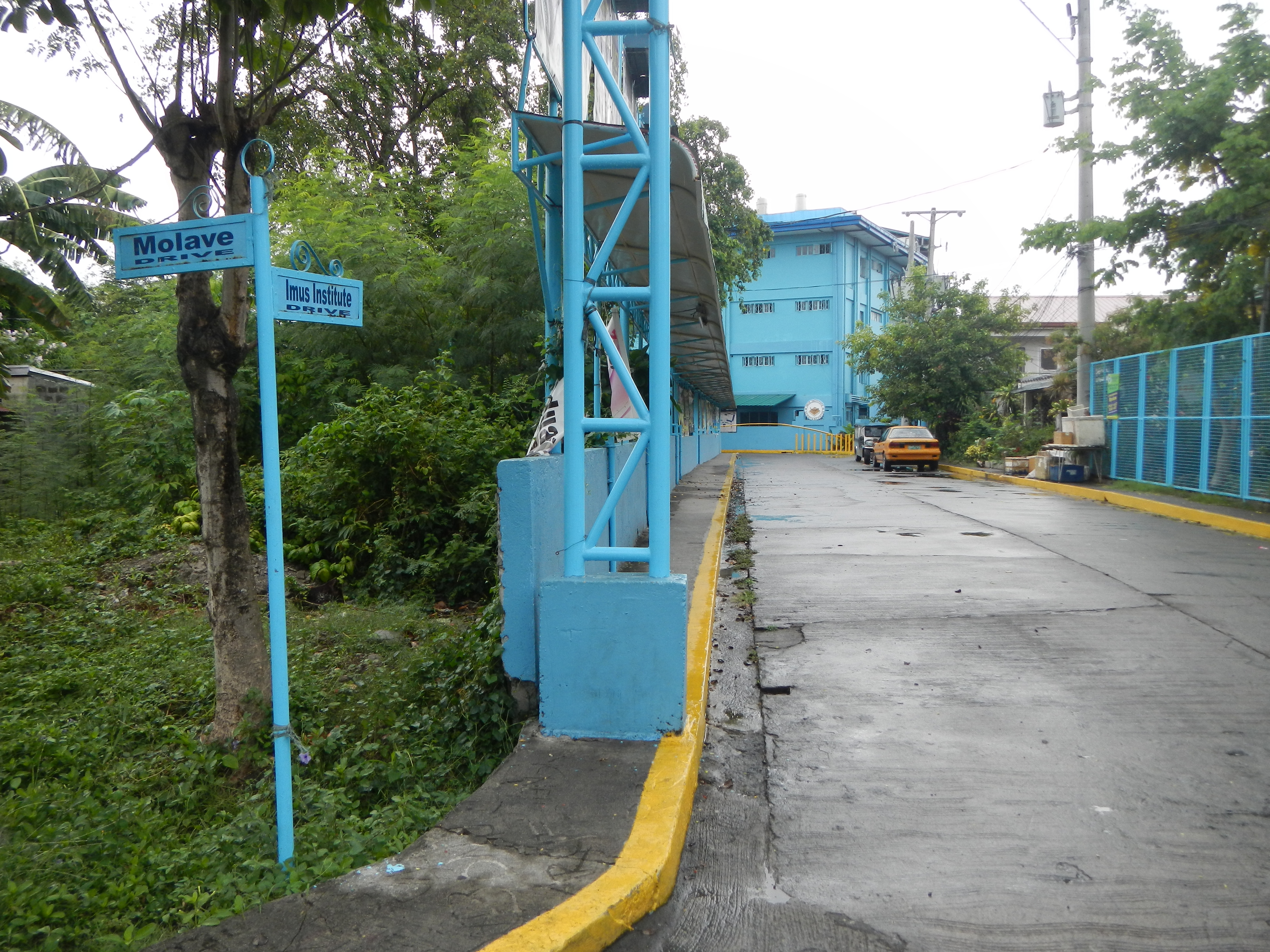
Entrance (Dimasalang Campus)

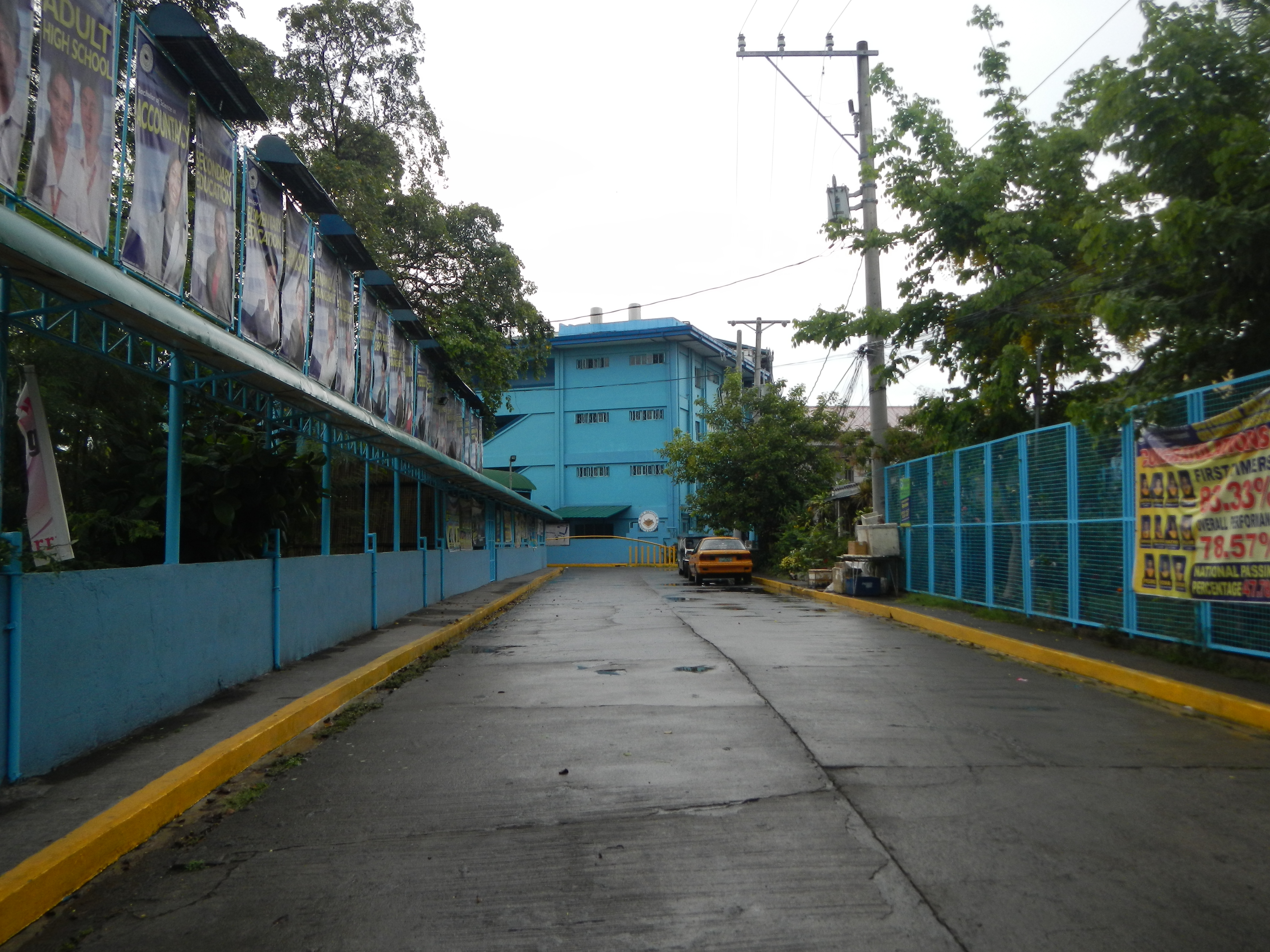
Facade, Imus, Cavite (Dimasalang Campus)
