= École nationale des sciences appliquées de Tanger =

Coordinates: 35°44′13″N 5°53′43″W

- المدرسة الوطنية للعلوم التطبيقية طنجة
- Type: Public engineering school
- Established: 1997
- Affiliation: Abdelmalek Essaâdi University
- Students: 1,253
- Location: Tangier, Morocco
- Website: ensat.ac.ma

The École nationale des sciences appliquées de Tanger (ENSAT) is a Moroccan public engineering school located in Tangier. It was established in 1997 by Abdelmalek Essaâdi University in partnership with the Institut national des sciences appliquées de Lyon. ENSAT is part of the national network of Écoles nationales des sciences appliquées (ENSA), a group of public engineering schools in Morocco.

== History ==
ENSAT was established in 1997 as part of the expansion of engineering education in Morocco. It is the first institution of the ENSA network.

== Academic programs ==
The engineering program at ENSAT extends over five years and is divided into two cycles:

- a two-year integrated preparatory cycle;
- a three-year engineering cycle leading to the state engineering degree.

The curriculum combines theoretical instruction, practical work, and internships. It also includes courses in humanities, social sciences, and management.

=== Preparatory cycle ===
The preparatory cycle provides a general foundation in scientific disciplines, including mathematics, physics, chemistry, and computer science. It also includes training in languages, particularly English, as well as introductory courses in engineering and management.

=== Engineering cycle ===
The engineering cycle consists of three years of specialization. The final semester is typically dedicated to a final-year project (PFE), usually carried out in collaboration with an industrial partner.

Students may choose from several engineering specializations:

- Telecommunications and network systems engineering
- Electronic and automatic systems engineering
- Computer engineering
- Industrial and logistics engineering
- Eco-energy and industrial environmental engineering
- Cybersecurity engineering

== Admission ==
Admission to ENSAT is based on a national competitive examination following a preselection phase based on academic performance in secondary education. Parallel admission procedures allow entry into the third or fourth year for candidates with relevant higher education qualifications.

== Student life ==
Student life at ENSAT includes a range of cultural, scientific, and social activities organized through student clubs and associations. A student body coordinates many of these activities within the institution.
