= Laila Mandi =

Moroccan Academician

Lailan Mandi
- Occupations: Professor of Water and Environmental Sciences
- Title: Professor
- Awards: Fellow of the African Academy of Sciences (FAAS) The Islamic Development Bank Prize for Women’s Contribution to Development

Academic background
- Education: Ph.D at Cadi Ayyad University
- Alma mater: Cadi Ayyad University

Laila Mandi is a Moroccan Professor of Water and Environmental Sciences at Cadi Ayyad University. She is a member of the African Academy of Sciences (AAS).

== Education ==
Laila Mandi holds a Ph.D. in wastewater treatment from the Faculty of Sciences at the University Cadi Ayyad, Semlalia, Marrakech in 1994.

== Honors and awards ==
In 2015, Laila Mandi was awarded the Islamic Development Bank (IDB) prize for Women’s Contribution to Development, recognising her as an outstanding researcher and contributor to Water Resources Management.

In 2023, she was also elected Fellow of the African Academy of Sciences (AAS).

In 2008, Laila Mandi was nominated as a Director of the National Centre for Studies and Research on Water and Energy at Cadi Ayyad University.

In 2001, she was nominated as a National coordinator of the Pole of Competences on “water and Environment” (PC2E), (2001-2016).

== Selected Publications ==
- Elabbas, S.; Ouazzani, N.; Mandi, L.; Berrekhis, F.; Perdicakis, M.; Pontvianne, S.; Pons, M-N.; Lapicque, F.; Leclerc, J-P (2016). "Treatment of highly concentrated tannery wastewater using electrocoagulation: Influence of the quality of aluminium used for the electrode". Journal of Hazardous Materials. 319: 69–77. Bibcode:2016JHzM..319...69E. doi:10.1016/j.jhazmat.2015.12.067. PMID 26777109.
- Achak, M.; Hafidi, A.; Ouazzani, N.; Sayadi, S.; Mandi, L. (2009). "Low cost biosorbent "banana peel" for the removal of phenolic compounds from olive mill wastewater: Kinetic and equilibrium studies". Journal of Hazardous Materials. 166 (1): 117–125. Bibcode:2009JHzM..166..117A. doi:10.1016/j.jhazmat.2008.11.036. PMID 19144464.
- Achak, M.; Hafidi, A.; Ouazzani, N.; Sayadi, S.; Mandi, L. (2009). "Low cost biosorbent "banana peel" for the removal of phenolic compounds from olive mill wastewater: Kinetic and equilibrium studies". Journal of Hazardous Materials. 166 (1). Elsevier BV: 117–125. Bibcode:2009JHzM..166..117A. doi:10.1016/j.jhazmat.2008.11.036. ISSN 0304-3894. PMID 19144464.
- Elabbas, Saliha; Mandi, Laila; Berrekhis, Fatima; Pons, Marie Noelle; Leclerc, Jean Pierre; Ouazzani, Naaila (2016). "Removal of Cr(III) from chrome tanning wastewater by adsorption using two natural carbonaceous materials: Eggshell and powdered marble". Journal of Environmental Management. 166. Elsevier BV: 589–595. Bibcode:2016JEnvM.166..589E. doi:10.1016/j.jenvman.2015.11.012. ISSN 0301-4797. PMID 26598282.
- Berradi, Achraf; Aziz, Faissal; Achaby, Mounir El; Ouazzani, Naaila; Mandi, Laila (2023-06-30). "A Comprehensive Review of Polysaccharide-Based Hydrogels as Promising Biomaterials". Polymers. 15 (13). MDPI AG: 2908. doi:10.3390/polym15132908. ISSN 2073-4360. PMC 10347036. PMID 37447553.
- Achak, Mounia; Ouazzani, Naaila; Yaacoubi, Abdelghani; Mandi, Laila (2008-04-29). "Caractérisation des margines issues d'une huilerie moderne et essais de leur traitement par coagulation-floculation par la chaux et le sulfate d'aluminium". Revue des sciences de l'EAU. 21 (1). Consortium Erudit: 53–67. doi:10.7202/017930ar. ISSN 1718-8598.
