= Church of the Assumption (El Jadida) =

Church in Mazagan, Morocco

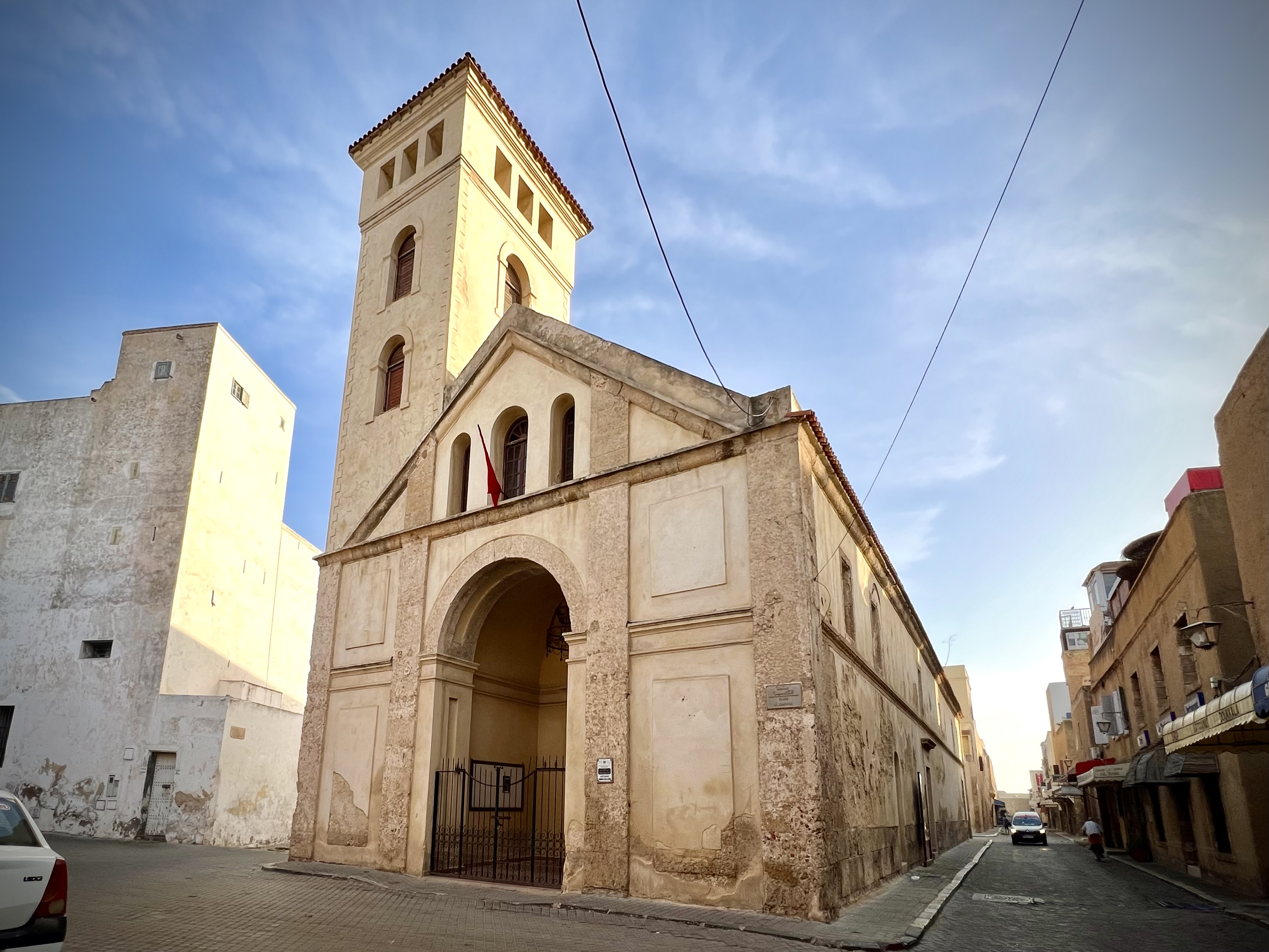

Location
- Location: El Jadida, Morocco
- Interactive map of Church of the Assumption

Architecture
- Type: church

Church of the Assumption or Church of Our Lady of Assumption is a Manueline church in the largely Portuguese-built city of Mazagan, currently El Jadida in Morocco. It was built in the early 16th century by the Portuguese.

== See also ==
- Portuguese Cistern (Mazagan)
- Portuguese Empire
