= Écoles nationales des sciences appliquées =

The network of Écoles nationales des sciences appliquées (ENSA, lit. 'National Schools of Applied Sciences') is a group of public engineering schools in Morocco. These institutions provide engineering education inspired by the French grandes écoles model.

The ENSA network is one of the main public engineering education systems in Morocco. It comprises several schools distributed across the country, including those located in Agadir, Al Hoceima, El Jadida, Fez, Kenitra, Khouribga, Marrakesh, Oujda, Safi, Tangier and Tétouan.

In addition to academic training, students from the ENSA network organize various events and initiatives. Among them, the ENSA Maroc Forum, initiated by students of ENSA Agadir, brings together students, faculty members and administrators from different ENSA institutions.

== List of schools ==
School	Acronym	Date of creation	Number os students (2009)
École nationale des sciences appliquées d'Agadir	ENSAA	1999	550
École nationale des sciences appliquées d'Al Hoceima	ENSAH	2008	160
École nationale des sciences appliquées d'El Jadida	ENSAJ	2008	250
École nationale des sciences appliquées de Fès	ENSAF	2005	304
École nationale des sciences appliquées de Kénitra	ENSAK	2008	-
École nationale des sciences appliquées de Khouribga	ENSAKH	2007	380
École nationale des sciences appliquées de Marrakech	ENSAMA	2000	259
École Nationale des Sciences Appliquées d'Oujda	ENSAO	1999	504
École nationale des sciences appliquées de Safi	ENSAS	2003	-
École nationale des sciences appliquées de Tanger	ENSAT	1997	496
École nationale des sciences appliquées de Tétouan	ENSATE	2008	200 (in 2011)
École nationale des sciences appliquées de Berrechid	ENSAB	2018	-

== Academic structure ==
ENSA programmes typically extend over five years. The first two years correspond to an integrated preparatory cycle, providing foundational training in scientific and technical disciplines.

This is followed by a three-year engineering cycle, during which students specialize in various fields of engineering depending on the institution and programme.

=== Specializations by institution ===
- ENSA Tanger
  - Telecommunication and Networks engineering
  - Computer science engineering
  - Electronic and Automatic Systems
  - Industrial engineering and Logistics
  - Energy and Environmental engineering
- ENSA Oujda
  - Software Engineering
  - Electrical Engineering
  - Industrial Engineering
  - Telecommunications and Networks
  - Embedded Systems, Computer and Networks Engineering
  - Civil Engineering
- ENSA Agadir
  - Computer engineering
  - Industrial engineering
  - Engineering Processes for Energy and the Environment
- ENSA Safi
  - Industrial engineering
  - Telecommunication and Networks engineering
  - Computer engineering
  - Process engineering and ceramic materials
- ENSA Fès
  - Computer engineering
  - Telecommunication and Networks engineering
  - Industrial engineering
  - Mechatronics engineering
  - Embedded engineering systems and industrial IT
- ENSA Al Hoceima
  - Computer engineering
  - Civil engineering
  - Data engineering
  - Environmental engineering
  - Energy Engineering and Renewable Energies
- ENSA El Jadida
  - Telecommunication and Networks engineering
  - Energy and power engineering
- ENSA Kénitra
  - Computer engineering
  - Mechatronics engineering
  - Telecommunication and Networks engineering
  - Electrical engineering
  - Industrial engineering
- ENSA Khouribga
  - Computer engineering
  - Telecommunication and Networks engineering
  - Engineering Processes for Energy and the Environment
  - Electrical engineering
- ENSA Tétouan
  - Computer engineering
  - Big Data and AI
  - Telecommunication and Networks engineering
  - Cybersecurity and CyberDefense
  - Mechatronics engineering
  - Logistics and Transportation engineering
  - Civil engineering
- ENSA Marrakech
  - Computer engineering
  - Telecommunication and Networks engineering
  - Electrical engineering
  - Industrial engineering and logistics
- ENSA Berrechid
- Aeronautical Engineering
  - Information Systems Engineering and Big Data
