= École nationale des sciences appliquées d'Agadir =

- ENSA Agadir
- Type: Public engineering school
- Established: 1999; 27 years ago
- Affiliation: Ibn Zohr University
- Director: Mohamed Wakrim
- Students: 1,500+
- Location: Agadir, Morocco

The École nationale des sciences appliquées d'Agadir (ENSA Agadir) is a public engineering school of Ibn Zohr University located in Agadir, Morocco. Established as part of the national expansion of engineering education, it belongs to the network of ENSA, which groups several public engineering schools across the country.

The institution provides training for state-certified engineers through a multidisciplinary curriculum combining theoretical instruction and practical applications, with the aim of meeting the needs of the industrial and socio-economic sectors.

== Academic programs ==
Engineering education at ENSA Agadir typically follows a five-year structure, including a two-year integrated preparatory cycle followed by a three-year engineering cycle leading to the state engineering degree.

The school offers several engineering specializations:

- Computer engineering
- Industrial engineering
- Engineering processes for energy and the environment
- Mechanical engineering
- Electrical engineering
- Financial engineering
- Civil engineering

== Admission ==
Admission to ENSA Agadir is primarily based on a national competitive examination following a preselection phase based on secondary school academic performance. Parallel admissions may also be available for students holding relevant two- or three-year higher education diplomas, subject to selection procedures.

== Student life ==
The school hosts various student clubs and associations that contribute to cultural, scientific, and sporting activities, fostering student engagement beyond academic training.
