= École nationale des sciences appliquées de Safi =

Coordinates: 32.3268°N 9.2637°W

- المدرسة الوطنية للعلوم التطبيقية بآسفي
- Type: Public engineering school
- Established: 2003; 23 years ago
- Affiliation: Cadi Ayyad University
- Location: Safi, Morocco
- Website: ensas.uca.ma

The École nationale des sciences appliquées de Safi (ENSA Safi) is a Moroccan public engineering school located in Safi. It is affiliated with Cadi Ayyad University and is part of the national network of Écoles nationales des sciences appliquées (ENSA), a group of public engineering schools across Morocco.

== History ==
ENSA Safi was established in 2003 as part of the expansion of engineering education in Morocco and the development of higher education institutions across different regions of the country.

== Academic programs ==
The engineering program at ENSA Safi is structured over five years and includes:

- a two-year integrated preparatory cycle;
- a three-year engineering cycle leading to a state engineering degree.

The curriculum combines theoretical instruction, practical work, and internships.

The school offers engineering programs in various fields of applied sciences and engineering, as well as master's and continuing education programs.

== Admission ==
Admission to ENSA Safi is based on a national competitive examination following a preselection process based on secondary school academic performance. Parallel admissions may also be available for candidates holding relevant higher education diplomas.

== Student life ==
Student life at ENSA Safi includes a range of cultural, scientific, and social activities organized through student clubs and associations. A student union coordinates many of these activities within the institution.

== Entrepreneurship ==
The school supports student entrepreneurship through partnerships and initiatives aimed at promoting entrepreneurial skills. In this context, a university incubator was established in 2021 in partnership with the OCP Group as part of the Act4Community program.
