= Abd al-Salam al-Fazazzi =

Moroccan writer

Abd Al Salam al Fazazzi
- Born: 17 October 1958 (age 68); Taza, Morocco
- Occupation: writer
- Awards: "Scientific Research Award of ibn Zohr University in Agadir in 2006" "Certificate of Honor by the International Society of Arab Translators in Dubai in 2006" "Ministry of Culture in Taza 2009"

Abd Al Salam al Fazazzi (Arabic:عبد السلام الفزازي) (born 17 October 1958) is a Moroccan writer, born in Taza, Morocco. He obtained a bachelor in Arabic Literature from Sidi Mohamed Ben Abdellah University, in Fes in 1983, and a certificate of completion of lessons in modern Arabic literature at the same university. He also obtained a degree to complete lessons in modern Arabic literature in the same university, and obtained Ph.D. in Modern Arabic Literature from the French University of Lyon in July 1992, and postgraduate diploma in the Faculty of Arts and Humanities in Agadir in 2002, He has been Professor and Director of teaching Arabic language for non-Arabic speakers since 1986, in the Faculty of Arts and Humanities in Agadir. He is member of the Academic Research Group for Personal Literature, member of the Research Group for World Translation and Culture, member of the University Theatre at the Faculty of Arts and Humanities in Agadir, and member of the Morocco Writers Union, member of the Arab Writers Union, and member of the Internet Writers Union.

== Works ==
There are several literary works that have been published by him, including: Novels:

- "oh, the time I missed" (original title: Āh yā zāmnān kẖltāhw), 2005.
- "memory filter" (original title: ṣāhyl ālḏākyrā) a novel, Beirut: Arab Scientific Publishers, 2006.
- "runaway dreams" (original title: Āḥlām hārybā) a novel, Beirut: Arab Scientific Publishers, 2006.
- "when the pain of homeland makes you cry...! a novel" (original title: ḥynā twbkykā āwǧāʿ ālwāṭān) 2017.
- "mirrors of wounded homeland" (original title: mrāyā ālwṭn ālǧryḥ), 2018.

Other publications:

- "articles in literature and linguistics" (original title: mqālāt fy ālādb wāl lysānyāt) (co-author), 1995.
- "Gerard Genette: A Critical Path" (original title: ǧyrār ǧnyt : msār nqdy), 1997.
- "I make an excuse, and pass on with broken memory" (original title: Ābwḥ ʿḏrān wā āmḍy ḏākrā mʿṭl) Marrakech, Morocco: Dar Lila, 1998.
- "In Culture and Literature:Works for the Soul of the Late Abd Al-nabi Mamouni" (original title: fy ālṯqāfā wāl ādb āʿmāl mhdāẗ lyrwḥ ālfqyd ʿbd ālnby māmwny) (co-author), 2002.
- "The Concept and Conditions of the Literary Institution" (original title: mfhwm ālmwāsāsā ālādbyā wa shwrwṭhā), Journal of Ibn Rushd University in the Netherlands.
- "Bad Arab Time" (original title: ālzmn ālʿrby ālrdyʾ), Cairo, 2007.
- "The Moroccan University between Reality Challenges and Future Prospects: Ibn Zohr University as a Model" (original title: ālǧāmʿā ālmġrbyā byn tāḥdyāt ālwāqʿ wā āfāq ālmstqbl: ǧāmʿā ibn zhr nmwḏǧān), 2009.
- "The Borrowed Time" (original title: ālzmn ālmstʿār) 2013.
- "The Status of Literary Criticism in Morocco: The Seventies as a Model" (original title: wḍʿyẗ ālnqd ālādby fy ālmġrb: mrḥālẗ ālsbʿynāt nmwḏǧān) The Historical “kan” Journal.
- "Semiology: A science of criticism or a criticism of science" (original title: ālsymywlwǧyā: ʿlm llnqd ām nqd llʿlm) Journal of Ibn Rushd University in the Netherlands, 2016.
- "Writing and Shattering in the Time of Facebook" (original title: ālktābā wālshthy fy zmn ālfys bwk) Rwafead publisher, 2018.
- "Saadi Youssef: The Path of My Poetry, A Critical Study" (original title: sʿdy ywsf: msār šʿry drāsā nqdyā) 2018.

== Awards ==
- He was awarded the Dar al-Numan Award in Lebanon with honorary affiliation to Al-Dar in 2003.
- He was awarded the Scientific Research Award of Ibn Zohr University in Agadir in 2006.
- He was awarded the Certificate of Honor by the International Society of Arab Translators in Dubai in 2006.
- He was awarded the Ministry of Culture in Taza 2009.
