= École nationale des sciences appliquées d'Al Hoceima =

Public engineering school in Al Hoceima, Morocco

Coordinates: 35.1720°N 3.8617°W

- المدرسة الوطنية للعلوم التطبيقية بالحسيمة
- Type: Public engineering school
- Established: 2008; 18 years ago
- Affiliation: Abdelmalek Essaâdi University
- Location: Al Hoceima, Morocco
- Website: ensah.ma

The École nationale des sciences appliquées d'Al Hoceima (ENSAH; National School of Applied Sciences of Al Hoceima) is a Moroccan public engineering school located in Al Hoceima, Al Hoceïma Province. Established in 2008, it is affiliated with Abdelmalek Essaâdi University and is part of the national network of schools of applied sciences (ENSA).

The institution provides multidisciplinary engineering education aimed at preparing state-certified engineers with both theoretical knowledge and practical skills.

== History ==
ENSA Al Hoceima was established in 2008 as part of the expansion of Morocco’s public engineering education system. Its creation aimed to strengthen higher education infrastructure in the northern region of the country and to support regional socio-economic development.

== Curriculum ==
The engineering programme typically follows a five-year structure:

- a two-year integrated preparatory cycle;
- a three-year engineering cycle leading to the state engineering degree.

Six specializations are offered:

- Computer engineering
- Civil engineering
- Environmental engineering
- Energies and renewable energies engineering
- Data engineering
- Mechanical engineering

== Admission ==
Admission to ENSAH is primarily based on a national competitive examination following a preselection phase based on secondary school academic performance. Parallel admissions may also be available for students holding relevant higher education diplomas, subject to institutional requirements.

== Campus and student life ==
The school is located in Al Hoceima and benefits from its integration within the Abdelmalek Essaâdi University system. Student life is organized around various clubs and associations that contribute to cultural, scientific, and sporting activities within the institution.

== See also ==
- Education in Morocco
- List of engineering schools
- List of universities in Morocco
