= Ikram Blilou =

Moroccan biologist and academic

- Born: Morocco
- Education: Abdelmalek Essaâdi University; University of Granada
- Scientific career
- Fields: Root development Transcriptional regulation Root stem cells Fluorescence imaging
- Workplaces: Utrecht University, The Netherlands Wageningen University Research, The Netherlands King Abdullah University of Science and Technology, Kingdom of Saudi Arabia
- Thesis: Aspectos moleculares de la respuesta defensiva de las plantas a la formación de la simbiosis micorriza arbuscular (1998)
- Website: www.kaust.edu.sa/ikram-blilou https://bliloulab.com/

Ikram Blilou is a Dutch Moroccan plant biologist who is a professor of plant sciences at King Abdullah University of Science and Technology. Her research investigates developmental programs controlling plants growth focusing on the root system as an important organ to engineer resilient crops

== Early life and education ==
Blilou was born in Morocco. She had originally intended to study medicine, but switched to plant sciences after being asked to dissect a mouse. She studied biology at the Abdelmalek Essaâdi University. She completed her doctoral research at the University of Granada, where she investigated the early defensive response of plants to arbuscular mycorrhizal (AM) symbiosis.

== Research and career ==
After graduating, Prof. Blilou moved to the Netherlands for postdoctoral research at Utrecht University, where she studied cell-cycle regulation and polar auxin transport. After completing her postdoctoral work, she was appointed as an assistant professor in the Department of Molecular Genetics at Utrecht University in 2003, where she established a line of research focusing on mechanisms regulating protein movement in plant roots. In 2006, she was awarded the prestigious Dutch VIDI and Aspasia grant and was promoted to the rank of associate professor. In 2012, she moved along with her department to Wageningen University, where she continued studying root development in Arabidopsis.

In 2017, Blilou moved to King Abdullah University of Science and Technology, Saudi Arabia, where she is currently leading several research projects, including stem cell regulation in model plants focusing on transcription factor networks as well as understanding how plants cope in desert environments. Her team uses multidisciplinary approaches, including high-resolution microscopy, tissue culture and plant transformation, genome editing technologies, and transcriptional assays. The team also implements deep learning and computer vision to analyze and quantify dynamic processes in vivo, ranging from protein associations to pathogen invasion, disease detection, and growth quantification.

Blilou is interested in how plants adapt to extreme environments. In particular, she looks at how plants develop resilience in desert environment focusing on date palm that she considers as a crop for the future due to the high nutritional value of its fruits.

In 2020, she was Awarded the first prize of the Khalifa International Award for Date Palm and Agricultural Innovation 2020 in the category Distinguished Innovative Studies and Modern Technology. In 2024, she won the international award from the National Center of Palms and Dates (NCPD), MEWA, in the category of the best scientific research.

== Selected publications ==
- Ikram Blilou; Jian Xu; Marjolein Wildwater; et al. (2005). "The PIN auxin efflux facilitator network controls growth and patterning in Arabidopsis roots". Nature. 433 (7021): 39–44. Bibcode:2005Natur.433...39B. doi:10.1038/nature03184. PMID 15635403. Wikidata Q33340720.
- Mitsuhiro Aida; Renze Heidstra; Viola Willemsen; et al. (2004). "The PLETHORA genes mediate patterning of the Arabidopsis root stem cell niche". Cell. 119 (1): 109–120. doi:10.1016/j.cell.2004.09.018. PMID 15454085. Wikidata Q42468459.
- Friml, Jiří; Benková, Eva; Ikram Blilou; et al. (2002). "AtPIN4 mediates sink-driven auxin gradients and root patterning in Arabidopsis". Cell. 108 (5): 661–673. doi:10.1016/s0092-8674(02)00656-6. PMID 11893337. Wikidata Q33336995.
