= École nationale des sciences appliquées de Tétouan =

National School of Applied Sciences-Tetouan
- المدرسة الوطنية للعلوم التطبيقية بتطوان
- Other name: ENSATE
- Type: Public
- Established: 2008; 18 years ago
- Academic affiliations: Abdelmalek Essaâdi University
- Director: Dr. Mostafa Stitou
- Location: Tetouan, Morocco; 35.56176646°N 5.36451461°W
- Campus: Urban
- Language: French
- Colors: Blue, Black and White
- Website: ensate.uae.ac.ma

The École nationale des sciences appliquées de Tétouan (ENSA Tétouan) is a public engineering school located in Tetouan, Morocco. It was established in September 2008 and is part of the network of Écoles nationales des sciences appliquées (ENSA). The school operates under the Abdelmalek Essaâdi University.

== Overview ==
ENSA Tétouan provides engineering education within the Moroccan higher education system. It is one of several ENSA institutions distributed across the country, offering a five-year curriculum leading to a state engineering degree.

== Mission ==
According to its official presentation, the institution aims to:

- train engineers through theoretical and practical education in various engineering fields;
- contribute to scientific and technological research;
- develop partnerships with industrial, socio-economic and academic actors at the regional, national and international levels.

== Academic programmes ==
The school offers several engineering programmes:

- Computer Engineering
- Data Science, Big Data & Artificial Intelligence
- Telecommunication and Networks Engineering
- Mechatronics Engineering
- Supply Chain Engineering
- Civil Engineering
