= Muhamed Mechbal =

Moroccan academic and critic

Mohamed Mechbal
- Born: 1960 (age 65–66)
- Occupation: Academic
- Writing career
- Notable awards: Sheikh Zayed Book Award 2018

Mohamed Mechbal (Arabic: محمد مشبال) is a Moroccan academic and critic. He is currently the head of Rhetoric and Discourse Analysis team is the College of Arts in Abdelmalek Essaadi University in Tétouan. He won the King Faisal International Prize in Arabic language and literature in its 43rd round in 2021.

== Works ==
- Rhetorical Sayings in Poetry Analysis (Original title: Maqoolat Balaghia fi Tahlil Alshi'r) (1993).
- Anecdote Rhetoric (Original title: Balaghat Al-Nadera) (1997).
- Secrets of Literary Criticism (Original title: Asrar Al-Naqd Al-Adabi) (2002).
- Rhetoric and Principles: A Study in the Fundamentals of Rhetorical Thought in Arabs - Ibn Jinni Exemplary (Original title: Al-Balagha wa Al-Osool: Dirasa fi Usus Al-Tafkeer Al-Balaghi 'End Al-Arab: Namoothaj ibn Jinni) (2007).
- Rhetoric and Narration: Al-Hajjaj’s Argumentation and Depiction in the Life of Al-Jahiz (Original title: Al-Balagha wa Al-Sard: Jadal Al-Hajjaj wa Al-Tasweer fi Akhbar Al-Jahiz) (2010).
- Rhetoric and Literature: From Language Imagery to Elocution Imagery (Original title: Al-Balagha wa Al-Adab: Min Suwar AL-Lugha ila Suwar AL-Khitab) (2010).
- The Egyptian Passion in the Moroccan’s Imagination (Original title: Al-Hawa Al-Masri fi Khayal Al-Maghariba) (2014).
- Ethics and Identity Speech in the Letters of Al-Jahiz: A Rhetorical Argumentative Approach (Original title: Khitab Al-Akhlaq wa Al-Hawiya fi Rasa'el Al-Jahiz: Moqaraba Balaghiya Hijajia) (2015).
- In the Rhetoric of Al-Hajjaj: Towards a Rhetorical Argumentative Approach to Discourse Analysis (Original title: Fi Balaghat Al-Hajjaj: Nahwa Moqaraba Balaghiya Hijajiya Litahleel Al-Khitabat) (2017).
- Rhetoric of the Autobiography (co-written) (Original title: Balaghat Al-Sira Al-Thatia) (2018)
- The Novel and Rhetoric: Towards an Expanded Rhetorical Approach of the Arabic Novel (Original title: Al-Riwaya wa Al-Balagha: Nahwa Muqaraba Balaghiya Hijajiya Litahlil Al-Khitab).

== Supervised books ==
- Innovation, Criticism, and Reality: A Reading in the Works of Sayed Al-Bahrawi, ElAin Publishing, 2010.
- Rhetoric of the Traditional Text, ElAin Publishing, 2010.
- Rhetoric and Elocution, Manshoorat Difaf wa Al-Ikhtilaf wa Dar Al-Aman, 2014.
- Rhetoric of the Religious Speech, Manshoorat Difaf wa Al-Ikhtilaf wa Dar Al-Aman, 2015.
- Rhetoric of the Autobiography, works dedicated to Dr. Mohammed Anqar, 2018.
- Rehtoric of the Historical Speech, works dedicated to Dr. Hamid Lahmidani, 2018.

== Translated books ==
- The Image in the Modern French Novel: Gide, Alain-Fournier, Proust, Camus by Stephen Ullman, (translated in cooperation), 1995.
- Playing in the Dark: Whiteness and the Literary Imagination by Toni Morrison, (translated in cooperation), 2009.
- Al-Hajjaj in Communicating by Philip Broton, (translated in cooperation), National Centre for Translation, Cairo, 2013.
- Oxford Encyclopedia of Rhetoric, (translated in cooperation), National Centre for Translation, Cairo.

== Awards ==
- Literary and Art Criticism Award, a category in Sheikh Zayed Book Award in 2018 for his book In the Rhetoric of Al-Hajjaj: Towards a Rhetorical Argumentative Approach to Discourse Analysis.
- Katara Prize for Arabic Novel in Critical Studies category in 2018 for his study The Novel and Rhetoric: Towards an Expanded Rhetorical Approach to the Arabic Novel.
- King Faisal International Prize in Arabic Language and Literature in 2021 for his works in general which align with the prize's theme, The New Rhetoric.
