= Abdellah Lahoua =

Moroccan footballer

Personal information
- Full name: Abdellah Lahoua
- Date of birth: 19 July 1986 (age 40)
- Place of birth: El Jadida, Morocco
- Height: 1.74 m (5 ft 8 1/2 in)
- Position: Midfielder

Team information
- Current team: Nahdat Berkane

Youth career
- ?–2005: Difaa El Jadida

Senior career*
| Years | Team | Apps | (Gls) |
| 2005–2013 | Difaa El Jadida | | |
| 2011–2012 | → FAR Rabat (loan) | 5 | (0) |
| 2013– | Nahdat Berkane | 32 | (3) |

International career^{‡}
| 2006–2008 | Morocco U-23 | | |
- * Club domestic league appearances and goals as of April 1, 2014 ‡ National team caps and goals as of 15:18, 22 February 2010 (UTC)

Abdellah Lahoua (born 19 July 1986) is a Moroccan footballer. He usually plays as midfielder. Lahoua is currently attached to Nahdat Berkane.

Lahoua played for the "B" Morocco national football team entering as a second-half substitute in a 2009 African Championship of Nations qualifying match against Algeria on 17 May 2008.

== See also ==
- Football in Morocco
- List of football clubs in Morocco
