= École nationale des sciences appliquées d'El Jadida =

Coordinates: 33.2488°N 8.5132°W

- المدرسة الوطنية للعلوم التطبيقية بالجديدة
- Type: Public engineering school
- Established: 2008; 18 years ago
- Affiliation: Chouaib Doukkali University
- Director: Az Eddine Azim
- Location: El Jadida, Morocco
- Website: ensaj.ucd.ac.ma

The École nationale des sciences appliquées d'El Jadida (المدرسة الوطنية للعلوم التطبيقية بالجديدة) is a Moroccan public engineering school located in El Jadida. It is affiliated with Chouaib Doukkali University and is part of the national network of schools of applied sciences (ENSA).

The institution is dedicated to training state-certified engineers through a multidisciplinary curriculum combining theoretical instruction and practical applications.

== History ==
The school was established in 2008 as part of the expansion of Morocco’s public engineering education system and the development of regional higher education infrastructure.

== Academic programs ==
The engineering programme follows a five-year structure:

- a two-year integrated preparatory cycle;
- a three-year engineering cycle leading to the state engineering degree.

The school offers specializations in the following areas:

- Computer engineering and emerging technologies
- Telecommunications and networks engineering
- Power and energy engineering

== Admission ==
Admission is based on a national competitive examination following a preselection phase. Parallel admissions may also be available for students holding relevant higher education diplomas, subject to selection procedures.

== Campus and student life ==
The institution is located in El Jadida and operates within the framework of Chouaib Doukkali University. Student life is supported by various clubs and associations contributing to cultural, scientific, and sporting activities.
