= École nationale des sciences appliquées de Khouribga =

- المدرسة الوطنية للعلوم التطبيقية بخريبكة
- Type: Public engineering school
- Established: 2007
- Affiliation: Sultan Moulay Slimane University
- Director: Moulay Saddik Kadiri
- Students: 1,100 (2020–2021)
- Location: Khouribga, Morocco
- Website: ensak.usms.ac.ma

The École nationale des sciences appliquées de Khouribga (ENSA Khouribga) is a Moroccan public engineering school affiliated with Sultan Moulay Slimane University in Beni Mellal. Established in 2007, it is part of the national network of Écoles nationales des sciences appliquées (ENSA).

The school was created within the framework of a national initiative aimed at increasing the number of trained engineers in Morocco.

== Academic programs ==
The institution offers several engineering programs in different fields:

- Computer engineering
- Computer science and data engineering
- Electrical engineering
- Smart grid engineering and cybersecurity
- Process, energy and environmental engineering
- Management and governance of information systems

== Organization of studies ==
The engineering program is structured over five years and includes:

- a two-year integrated preparatory cycle;
- a three-year engineering cycle leading to the state engineering degree.
