= École nationale des sciences appliquées de Kénitra =

Moroccan engineering school

- المدرسة الوطنية للعلوم التطبيقية القنيطرة
- Type: Public engineering school
- Established: 2008
- Affiliation: Ibn Tofail University
- Director: Mohamed Nabil Srifi
- Location: Kenitra, Morocco
- Website: ensa.uit.ac.ma

The École nationale des sciences appliquées de Kénitra (ENSAK) (Arabic: المدرسة الوطنية للعلوم التطبيقية القنيطرة) is a Moroccan public engineering school located in Kenitra. It was established in 2008 through a partnership between Ibn Tofail University and the Institut national des sciences appliquées de Lyon.

It is part of the national network of Écoles nationales des sciences appliquées (ENSA), which groups several public engineering schools across Morocco.

== History ==
The school was founded in 2008 as part of the expansion of public engineering education in Morocco.

== Academic programs ==
The engineering curriculum is organized over five years and includes:

- a two-year integrated preparatory cycle;
- a three-year engineering cycle leading to the state engineering degree.

The school offers several engineering specializations:

- Computer engineering
- Telecommunications and networks engineering
- Electrical engineering
- Industrial engineering
- Mechatronic engineering
- Energy efficiency and smart buildings

== Admission ==
Admission to ENSAK is based on a national competitive examination following a preselection phase based on secondary school academic results. Parallel admissions may be available for candidates holding relevant higher education diplomas.

== Organization ==
The institution operates within Ibn Tofail University and is organized into academic departments corresponding to its fields of specialization.
