= École Nationale des Sciences Appliquées d'Oujda =

Coordinates: 34°39′02″N 1°53′48″W

École nationale des sciences appliquées d'Oujda
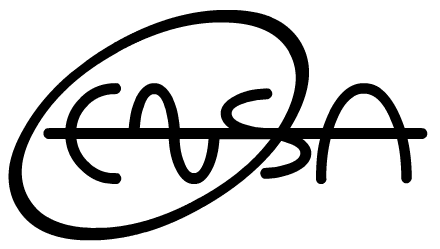
- Other names: المدرسة الوطنية للعلوم التطبيقية
- Type: Public engineering school
- Established: 1999
- Affiliations: Mohammed I University
- Administration: Roubi Larabi (Director); Rahmoun Mohammed (Deputy Director)
- Academic staff: 73–41 (professors), 32 (administrative staff and engineers)
- Students: 660 (2010/2011)
- Location: Oujda, Morocco
- Campus: Mohammed I
- Language: English, French
- Website: ensao.ump.ma

The École nationale des sciences appliquées d'Oujda (ENSA Oujda) is a Moroccan Grande école of engineering and part of the ENSA network, a group of public higher education institutions in Morocco.

== History ==
ENSAO was established in 1999 and is located in Oujda.

== Academics ==
The program of study lasts five years and is divided into two cycles:

- Preparatory cycle (2 years)

During this cycle, instruction focuses on fundamental engineering sciences, including mathematics, physics, chemistry, mechanics, and computer science. The curriculum progressively introduces more specialized scientific and technical subjects. This cycle provides students with a general academic foundation for engineering studies.

The first cycle is selective, and examinations during this period are used to assess students’ ability to continue in the program.

- Engineering cycle (3 years)

At the end of the second year of study, students choose a specialization among those offered by the school. The allocation of specializations is based on students’ academic performance.

== Admissions ==
Admission to ENSA Oujda is done through a selective competitive exams- written and oral interview- during the year of the bac:

- A preselection of candidates on the basis of the average obtained in their baccalaureat degree.
- A contest are invited shortlisted candidates.

It is possible to enter the school's engineering cycle via bac +2 level, through competitive exam and interviews based on knowledge and motivation. The training lasts for 3 years the after 2 years post-BAC. This type of admission is open to students from preparatory classes, universities, or scientific undergraduate degree courses.

== Programmes offered ==
- Data Science and Cloud Computing Engineering
- Software engineering
- Electrical engineering
- Industrial engineering
- Telecommunications and Networks
- Embedded Systems, Computer & Networks Engineering
- Cyber Security Engineering

== Forum ENSAO-Enterprise ==
Since its first edition in 2005, The Forum "ENSAO-ENTREPRISE" imposed its value and is marked with an undeniable national reputation . It offers both engineering students, businesses, and multinationals a valuable opportunity to meet and to ensure a fluid opening on topics concerning engineering in its socio-economic context. In fact, the National School of Applied Sciences Oujda place in a region that encourages ambitious investment and today has known major projects such as the "Technopole" of Oujda, the thermal power plant of Ain Bni Mathar and tourism in Saïdia, projects that graduates of this great school surely participate.
