= École nationale des sciences appliquées de Marrakech =

Coordinates: 31.6468°N 8.0203°W

The École nationale des sciences appliquées de Marrakech (ENSA Marrakech) is a public higher education institution in Morocco specializing in engineering education. Established in 2000 by the Ministry of Higher Education, it is a component of the Cadi Ayyad University located in Marrakesh.

The school is part of the national network of Écoles nationales des sciences appliquées (ENSA), which aims to train engineers in various scientific and technical fields. Its creation is associated with the diversification of academic programs within the university system and with efforts to support regional socio-economic and industrial development.

== Programmes offered ==
ENSA Marrakech offers engineering programmes in several fields, including:

- Computer engineering
- Telecommunications and networks engineering
- Electrical engineering
- Industrial engineering and logistics
