= Portuguese Cistern (Mazagan) =

Ancient cistern in Morocco

Portuguese cistern (Mazagan)
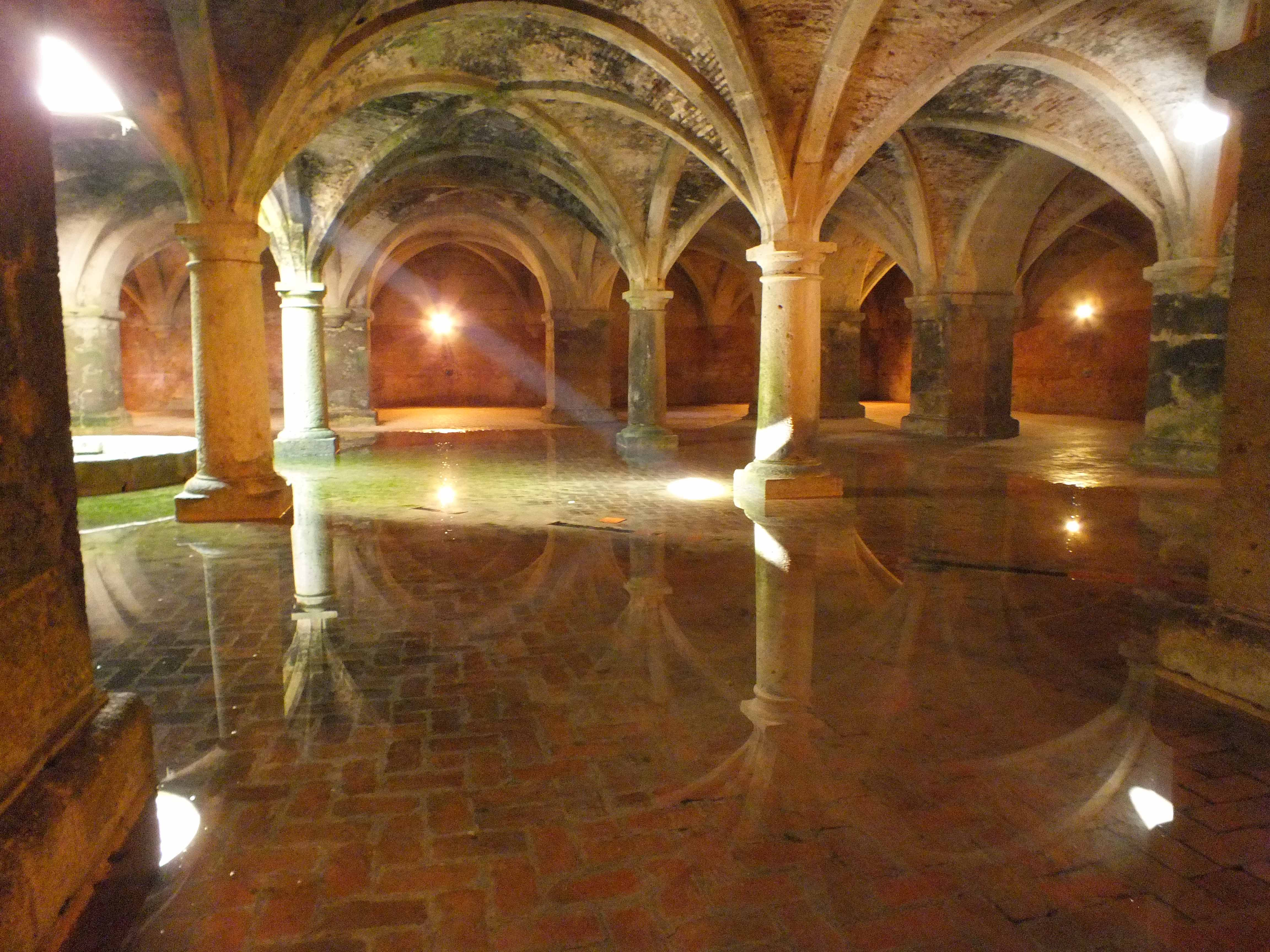
- Portuguese Cistern in El Jadida

- Location within Morocco
- 33°15′24″N 8°30′10″W
- Location: El Jadida

The Portuguese Cistern is a historic cistern in El Jadida, Morocco. It is located beneath the citadel at the heart of the historic Portuguese fortified city of Mazagan. It is a classified cultural heritage monument in Morocco and, along with the rest of the old walled city, forms part of a UNESCO World Heritage Site.

== History ==
The cistern was built beneath the Citadel, the original fort and first permanent structure that the Portuguese built on this site in 1514, before it was expanded into the larger walled fortress in 1541. The chamber's original function is not clear. It may have been an armory, barracks, or granary, but it is recorded as having been converted into a cistern in 1541. It was designed by an architect named Miguel de Arruda but the construction work was delegated to João de Castilho. The cistern has been used as a filming location for several movies, of which Orson Welles' Othello is the best known internationally.

== Architecture ==
The semi-subterranean chamber has a roughly square plan measuring around 33 to 34 metres (108 to 112 ft) per side, was constructed with five rows of five stone pillars and columns. The chamber is built in a late Gothic style known as Manueline. A round opening in the center of the chamber served to collect rainwater.

The cistern is known today for the visual impression created by the thin layer of water covering the floor, which creates ever-changing reflections from the single shaft of light through the central hole in the ceiling.

== Gallery ==
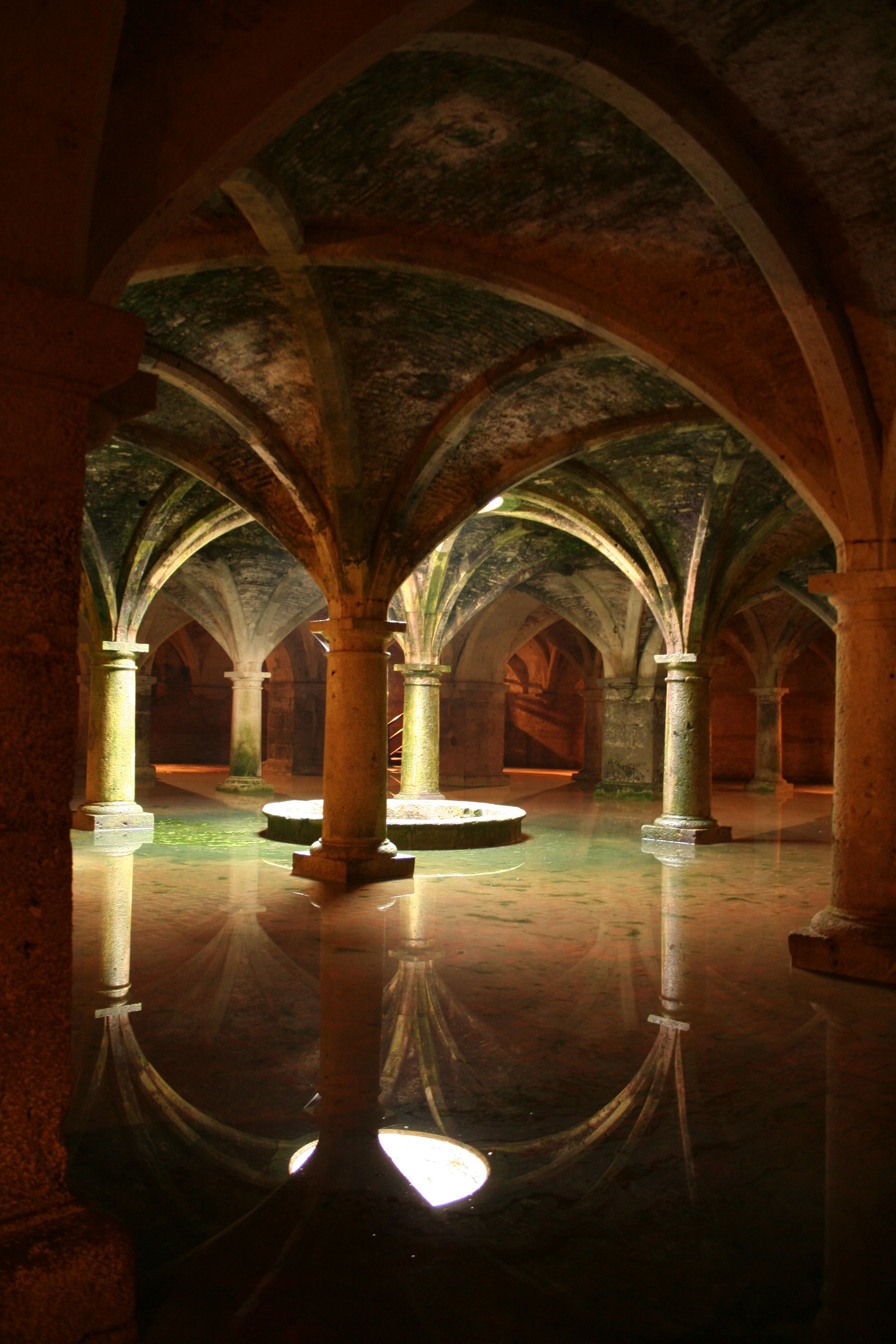

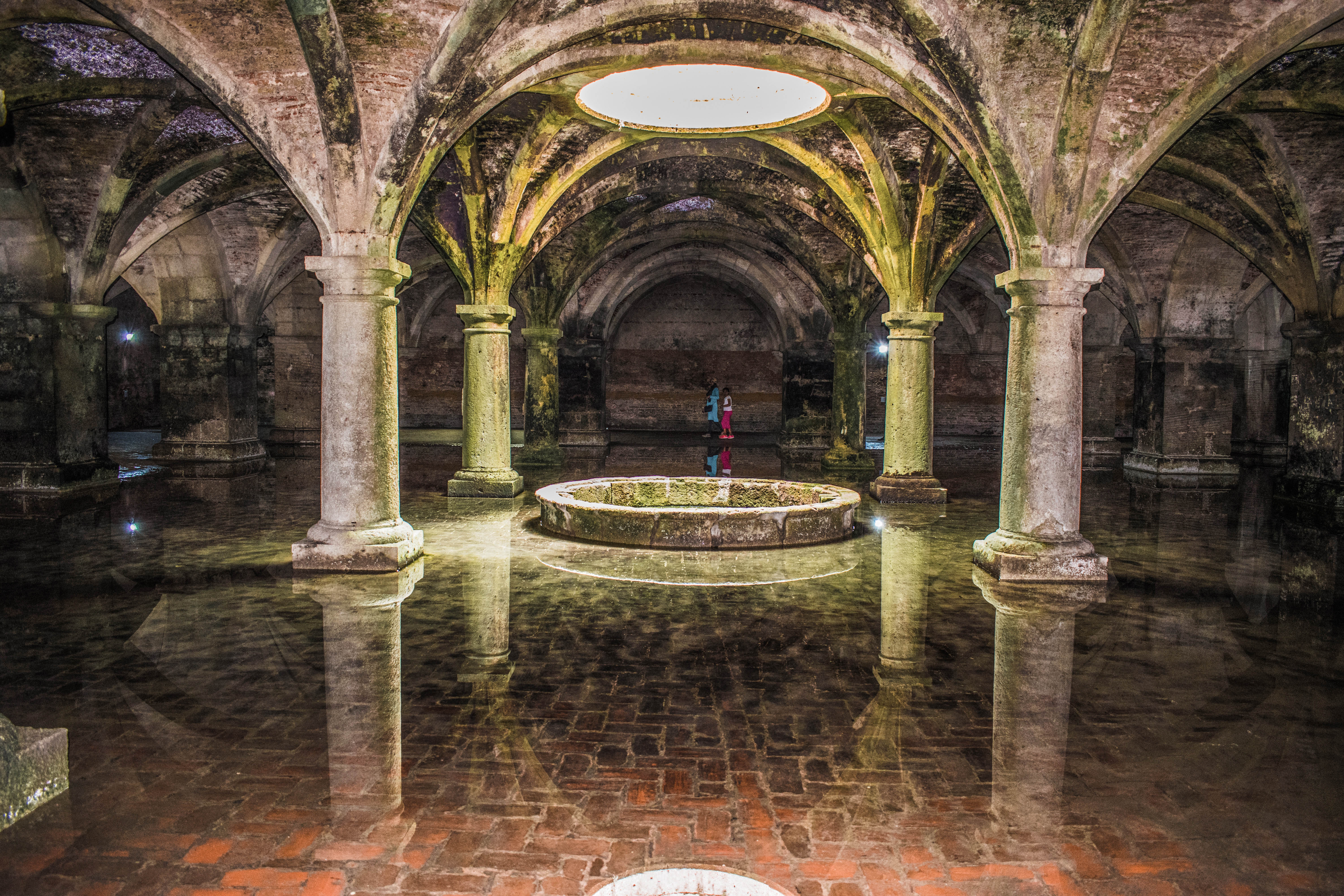

== See also ==
- Portuguese Empire
