= El Jadida =

Town in Casablanca-Settat, Morocco

El Jadida الجديدة ⵍⵊⴷⵉⴷⴰ
- City
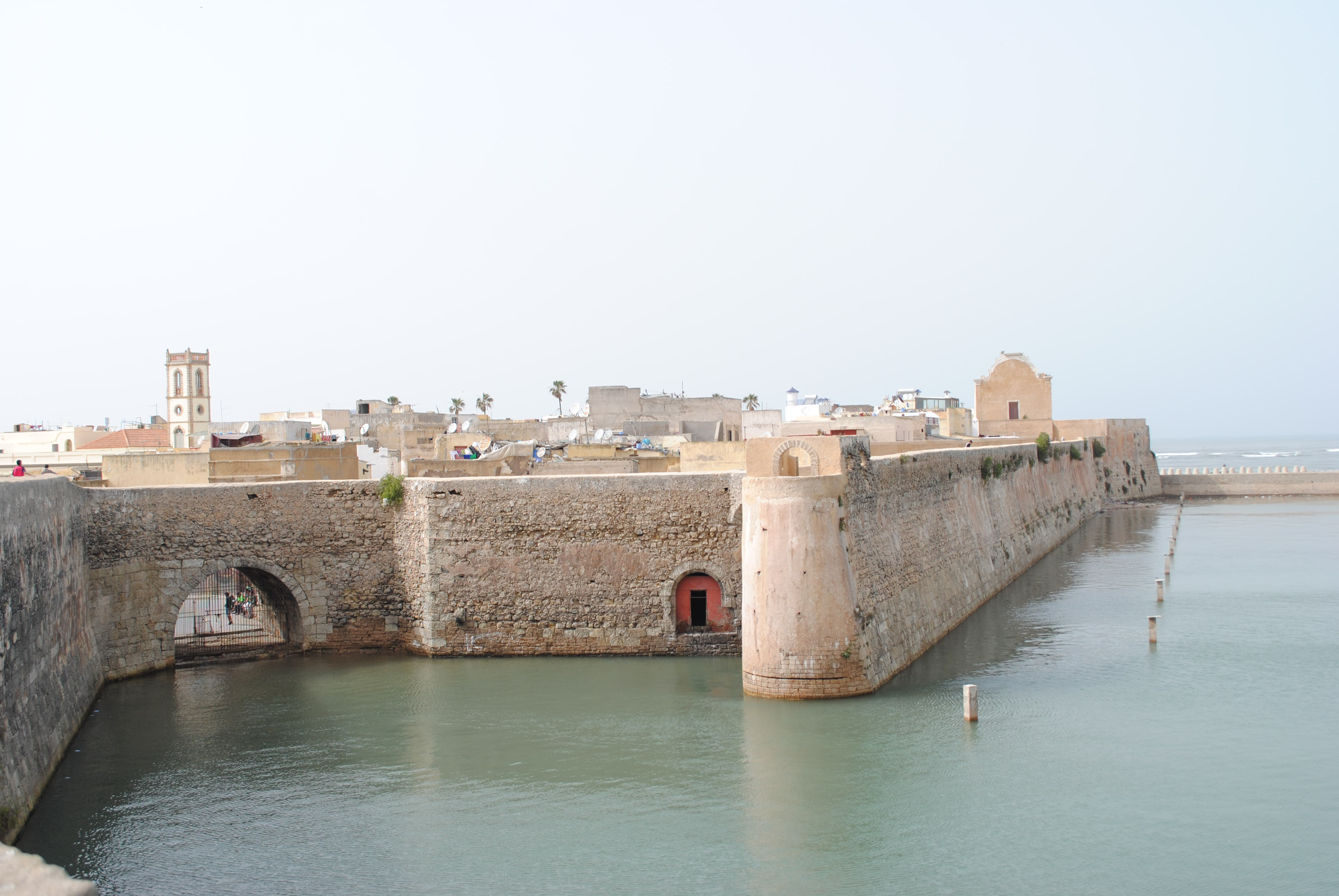
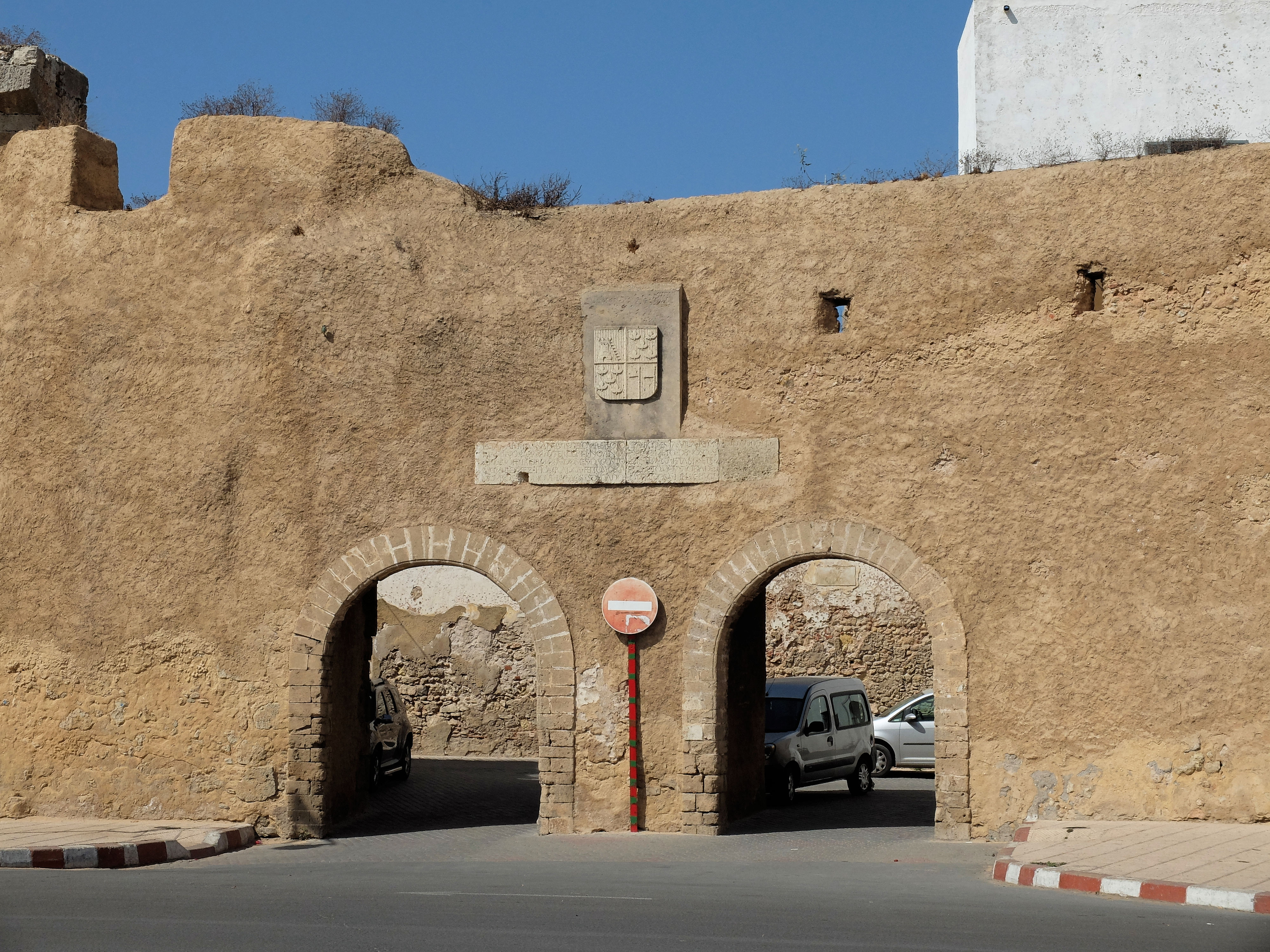
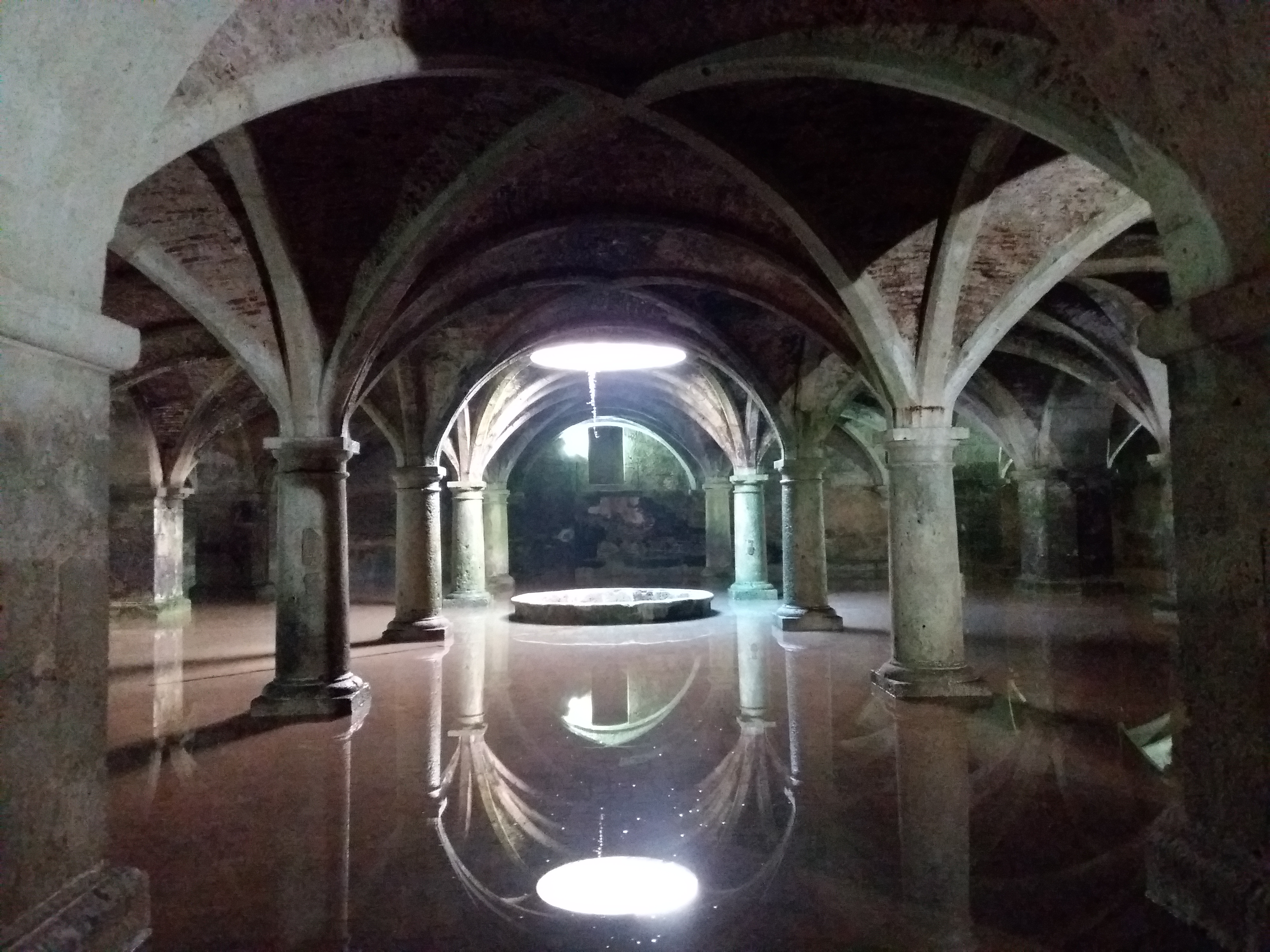
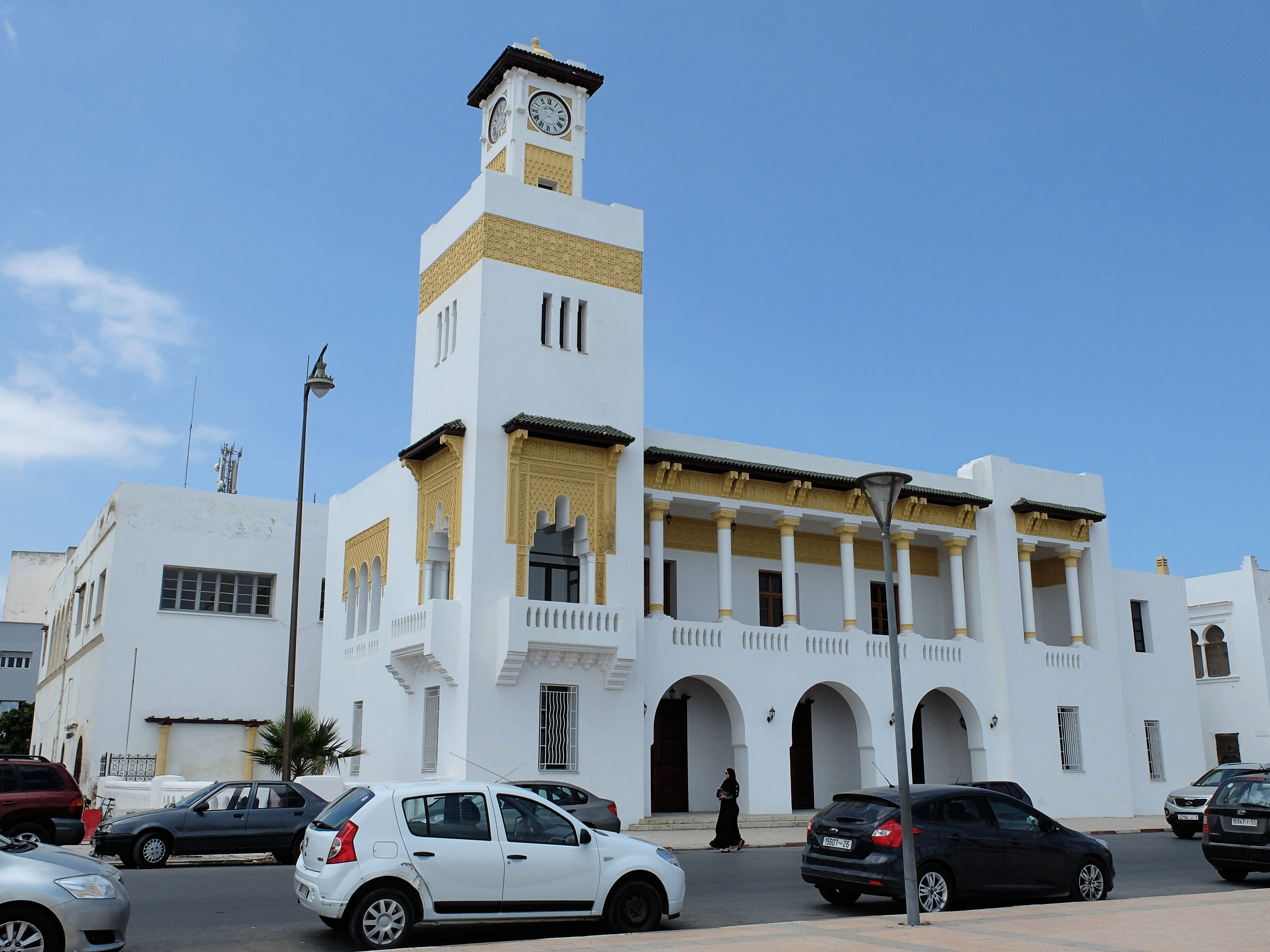
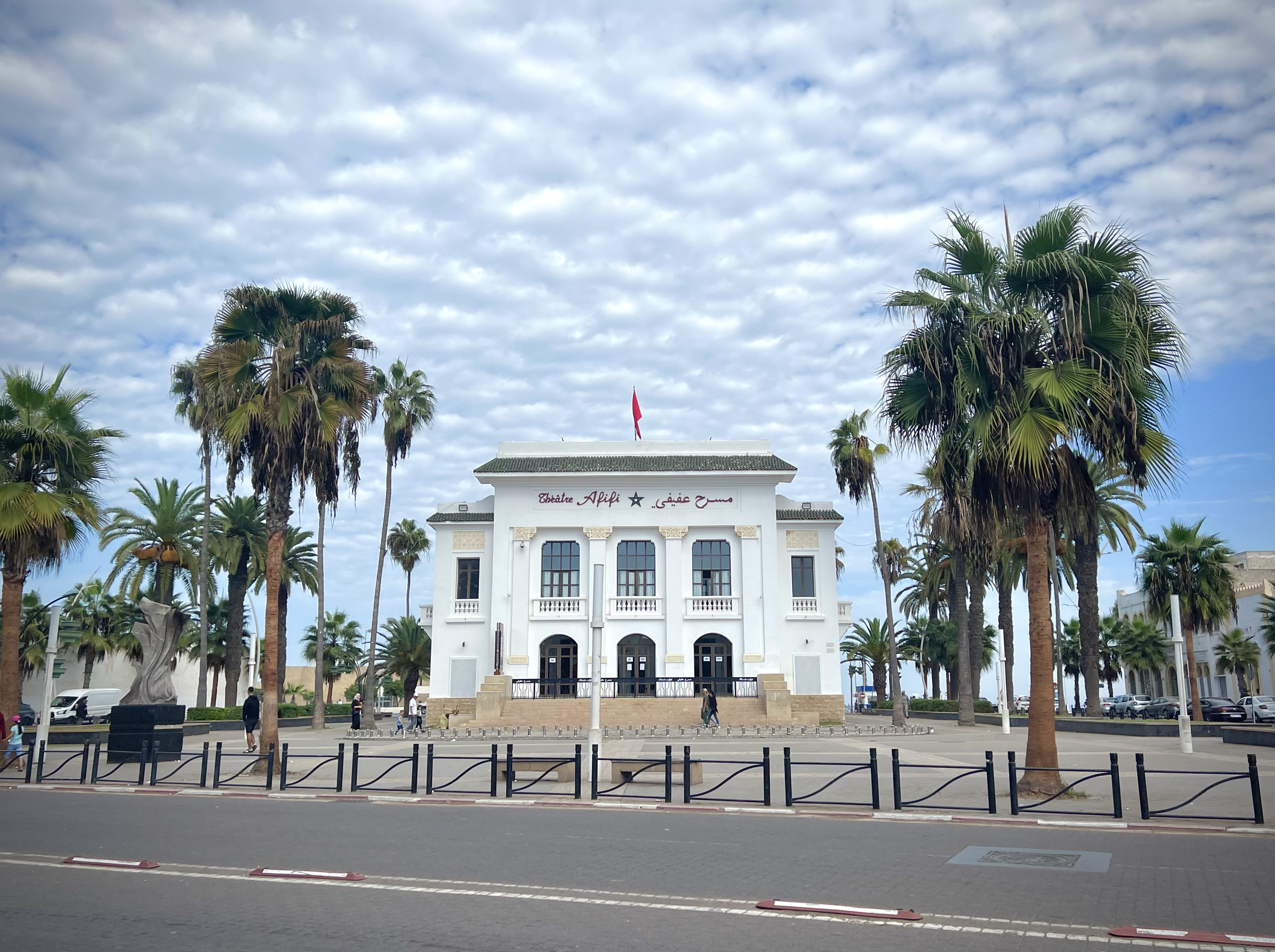
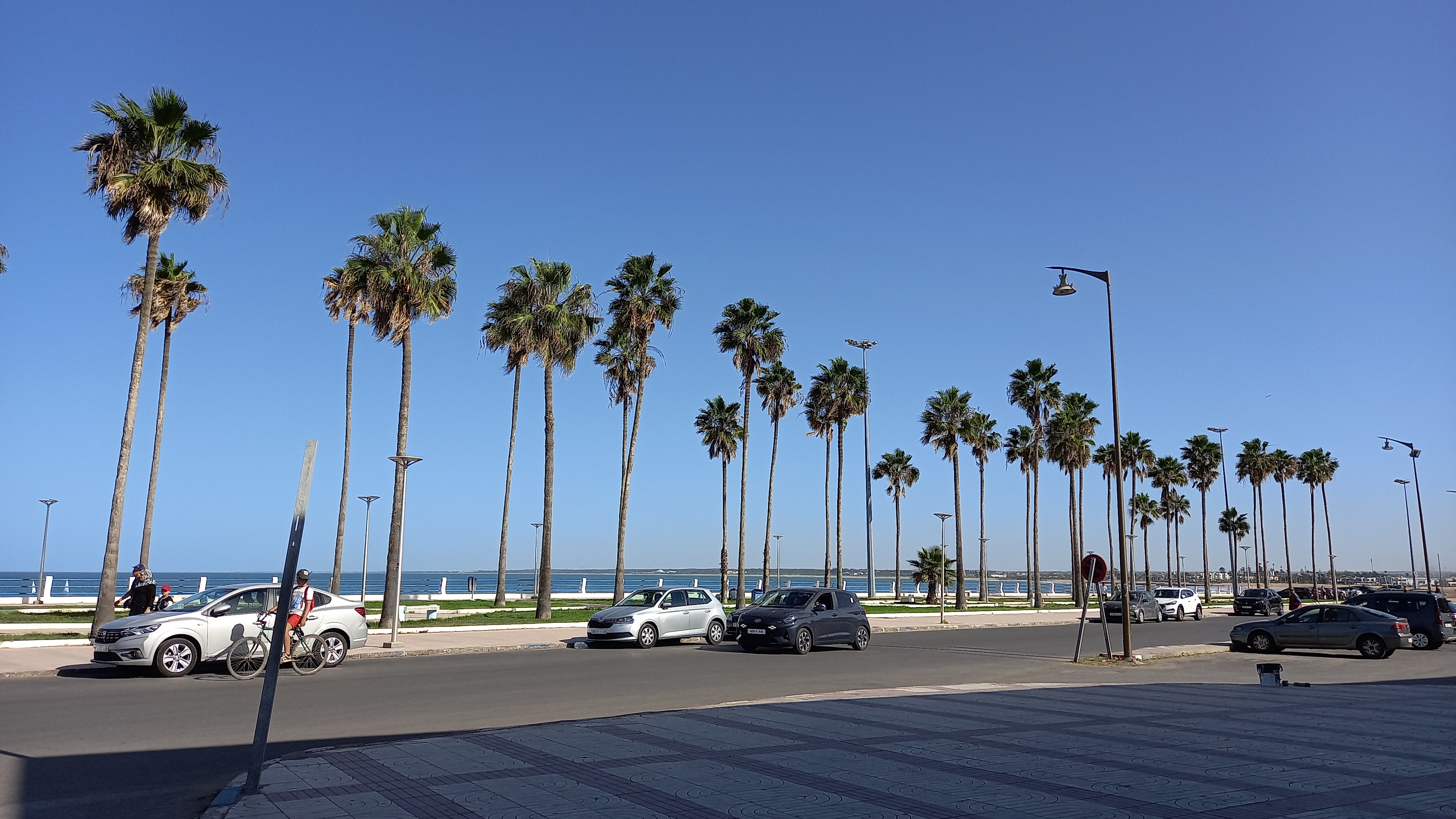
- Clockwise from top: the old city walls, the Portuguese cistern, Mohamed Afifi Theater, the Corniche, a colonial-era building in El Jadida, the gate to the old city
- Interactive map of El Jadida
- Coordinates: 33°14′N 8°30′W
- Country: Morocco
- Region: Casablanca-Settat
- Province: El Jadida

Government
  - Mayor: Jamal Benrabia (Istiqlal)

Population (2024)
  - Total: 237,464
  - Rank: 15th in Morocco
- Time zone: UTC+0 (GMT)

UNESCO World Heritage Site
- Official name: Portuguese City of Mazagan (El Jadida)
- Type: Cultural
- Criteria: ii, iv
- Designated: 2004 (28th session)
- Reference no.: 1058
- Region: Arab States

El Jadida (Arabic: الجديدة, romanized: al-Jadīda, [alʒadiːda]; Standard Moroccan Tamazight: ⵍⵊⴷⵉⴷⴰ, romanized: ljdida) is a major port city on the Atlantic coast of Morocco. It is located in the province of El Jadida, Casablanca-Settat, 96 kilometres (60 mi) south of the city of Casablanca. It has a population of 237,564 as of 2024.

The fortified city, built by the Portuguese at the beginning of the 16th century and named Mazagan (Mazagão in Portuguese), was given up by the Portuguese in 1769 and incorporated into Morocco. El Jadida's old city sea walls are one of the Seven Wonders of Portuguese Origin in the World. The Portuguese Fortified City of Mazagan was registered as a UNESCO World Heritage Site in 2004, on the basis of its status as an "outstanding example of the interchange of influences between European and Moroccan cultures" and as an "early example of the realisation of the Renaissance ideals integrated with Portuguese construction technology". According to UNESCO, the most important buildings from the Portuguese period are the cistern and the Church of the Assumption, both in a Manueline style.

The city is a popular resort and destination for both Moroccan and international tourists. An important industrial complex, Jorf Lasfar, lies 20 kilometres to the south.

== Names ==
El Jadida's other names and nicknames in other languages were: Cap Soleis, Portus Rutilis, Rusibis, Mazighen (Arabic: مازيغن), al-Breyja (Arabic: البريجة), Mazagão, al-Mahdouma (Arabic: المهدومة) and Mazagan. The city was renamed al-Jadida in 1820, meaning 'The New'.

== History ==
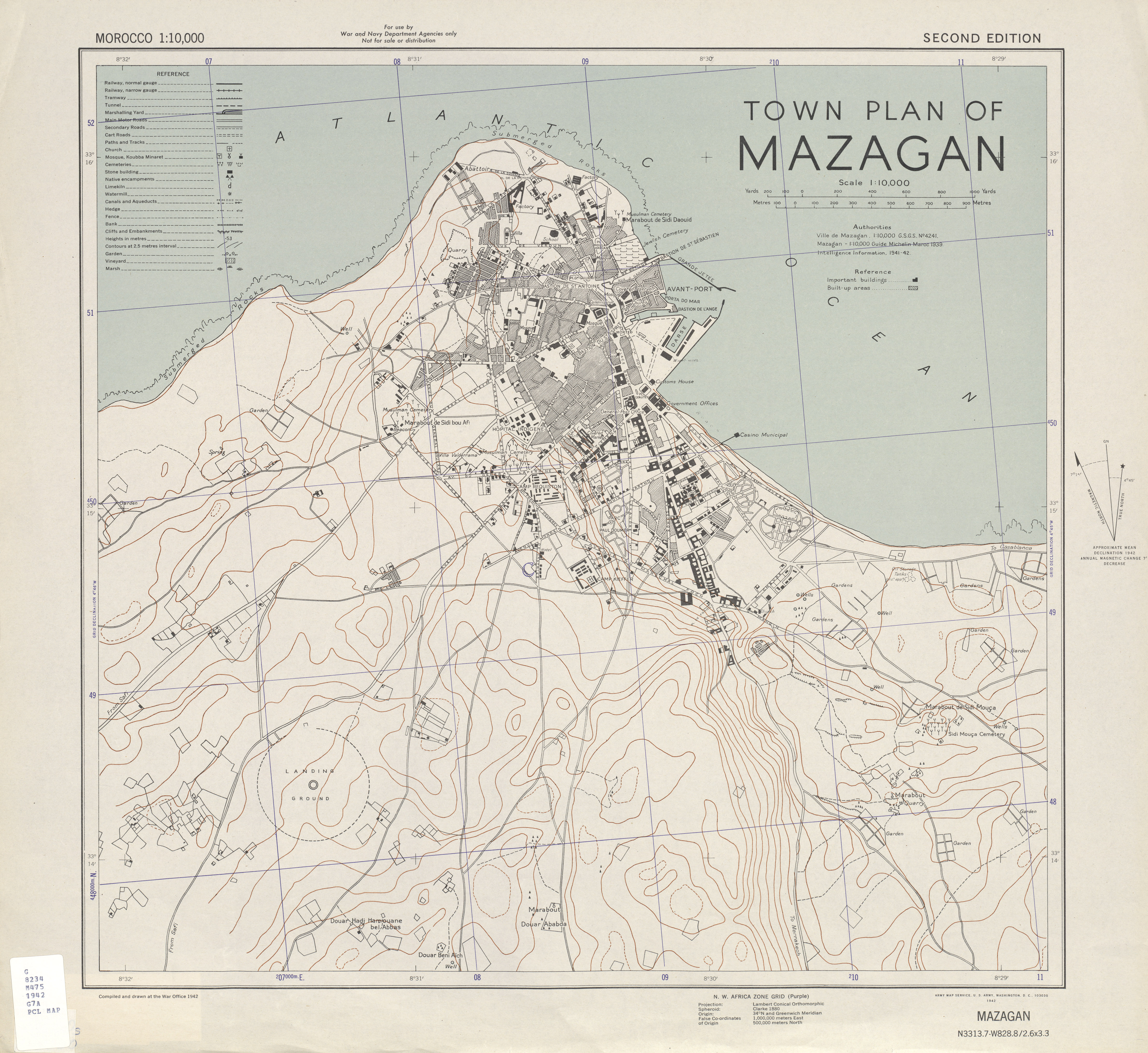
Map of Mazagan created by the US government in 1942

El Jadida traces its origins to the 5th century BC, when it was founded and settled by the Phoenicians.

Prior to the arrival of the Portuguese in the 16th century, an anchorage used by boats appears to have existed at the current site of El Jadida throughout the Middle Ages and in ancient times. The name Mazighan was first documented by the 11th-century Arab geographer al-Bakri. In 1502 a Portuguese captain, Jorge de Mello, landed at this location, allegedly driven here by a storm. He and his crew took refuge in an abandoned tower, called al-Briya or al-Burayja, to defend themselves against any potential attack by the locals. After returning to Portugal, he obtained permission from the Portuguese king, Dom Manuel, to found a fortress here in 1505, but evidence indicates that he did not carry this out, as when the Portuguese army passed here on their way to conquer Azemmour in 1513 they found nothing but the old tower.

As Azemmour was difficult to access, the Portuguese returned and built a citadel at the more accessible Mazighan in the summer of 1514. This citadel was a rectangular building with four towers, one of which was the old tower that already stood here. The architects were two brothers, Diogo and Francisco de Arruda. The location then became known in the Portuguese language as Mazagão. During the next few decades the Sa'dids rose to power and began expelling the Portuguese from their coastal fortresses, with the most significant event being their expulsion from Santa Cruz (present-day Agadir) in 1541. In response, King João III of Portugal ordered the evacuation of Portuguese positions at Azemmour and Safi and concentrated on building a more defensible position at Mazagão instead. As a result, the Portuguese fortification was expanded into the larger walled fortress we see today in 1541.

The Kingdom of Portugal would continue to control the city until 1769, when they abandoned Mazagão, their last territory in Morocco. Upon their forced departure, the Portuguese destroyed the Governor's Bastion. Most of the Portuguese inhabitants were sent to the colony of Brazil, where they founded a new settlement called Nova Mazagão (the present Mazagão in the state of Amapá). The city was then taken over by Sultan Mohammed ben Abdallah in 1769 and remained largely uninhabited, having been dubbed al-Mahdouma ('The Ruined'). Eventually, Sultan Abd al-Rahman (r. 1822–1859) ordered that a mosque be built, and the destroyed portions of the city were rebuilt during his reign in the early nineteenth-century. In 1820 the city was renamed al-Jadida, meaning 'The New'. The town underwent a revival and soon outgrew Azemmour as the most important city in the area. Alongside the Muslim population was also a community of Jews, who participated in the city's revival.

At the beginning of the French Protectorate in Morocco (established in 1912), the city was developed as a tourist resort, one of the earliest initiatives to develop modern tourism in Morocco. By the 1930s it had a casino which was popular with European tourists and colonists. The importance of the city's port, however, declined as Casablanca grew into the major port and urban center of the country during this period. In the 1980s a large industrial complex, Jorf Lasfar, was developed some 20 kilometres to the south. Aided by its UNESCO World Heritage Site designation since 2004, the city continues to be a tourist destination today.

During the September 2023 earthquake that struck southern Morocco, the historic Portuguese church in the old city was damaged. As of 13 September, cracks were observed in the church's tower and there was a risk of structural collapse.

== Landmarks ==
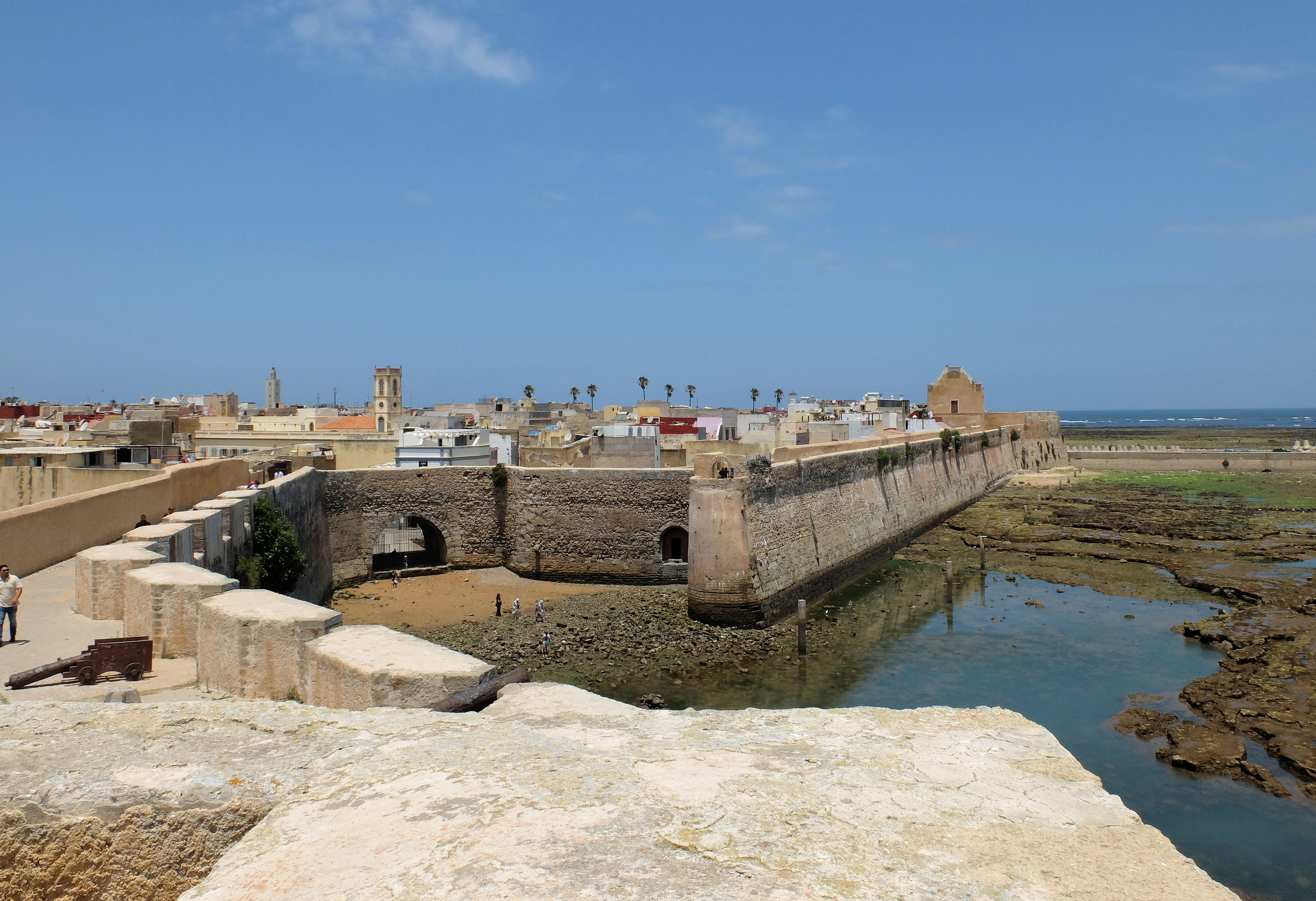
The walls of Mazagan, with the sea gate visible in the middle left

=== Fortress of Mazagan ===
The design of the Fortress of Mazagan is a response to the development of modern artillery in the Renaissance. The star form of the fortress measures c 250m by 300m. The slightly inclined, massive walls are c 8m high on average, with a thickness of 10m, enclosing a patrolling peripheral walkway 2m wide. At the present time the fortification has four bastions: the Angel Bastion in the east, St Sebastian in the north, St Antoine in the west, and the Holy Ghost Bastion in the south. The fifth, the Governor's Bastion at the main entrance, is in ruins, having been destroyed by the Portuguese in 1769. Numerous colonial-era Portuguese cannons are still positioned on top of the bastions.

The fort had three gates: the Seagate, forming a small port with the north-east rampart, the Bull Gate in the north-west rampart, and the main entrance with a double arch in the centre of the south rampart, originally connected to land via a drawbridge. A ditch, c 20m wide and 3m deep, formerly filled with seawater, surrounded the fort. During the time of the French Protectorate the ditch was filled in with earth and a new entrance gate was opened leading to the main street, the Rua da Carreira, and to the Seagate. Along this street are situated the best preserved historic buildings, including the Catholic Church of the Assumption and the Portuguese cistern.

==== The Citadel ====
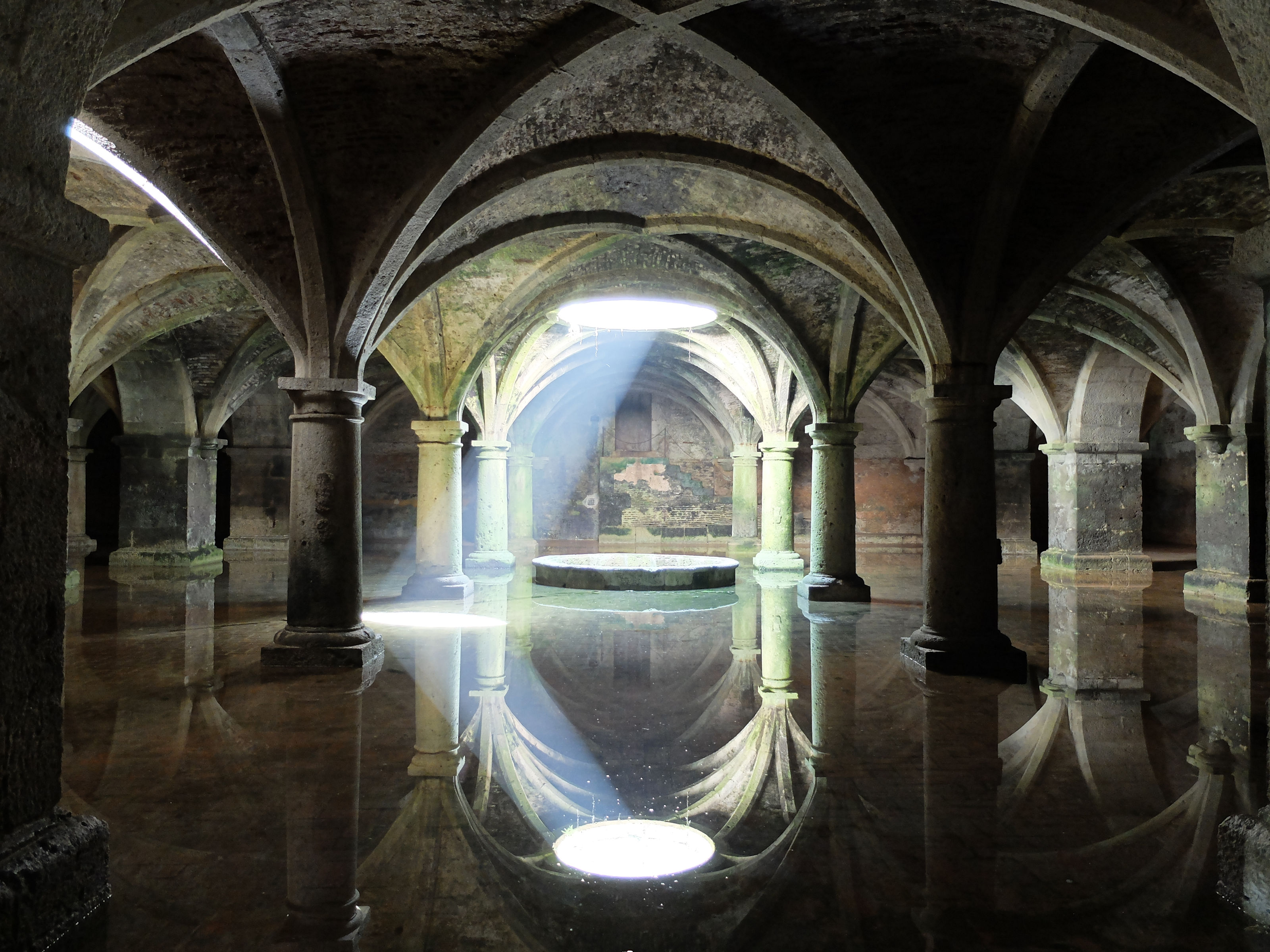
Portuguese cistern under the citadel of Mazagan, in Manueline style

The Citadel, located at the heart of the walled city, was the first permanent Portuguese construction on this site in 1514. It is a building with a rectangular floor plan measuring about 47 by 56 metres (154 by 184 ft), with three major rooms around a central space and four towers (one at each corner). The southern El-Briya Tower (originally known as al-Burayja) was of local, pre-Portuguese origin and it was here that the Portuguese first took refuge when they arrived in 1502. One of the northern towers was later re-purposed as the base of a 19th-century minaret built for the nearby mosque. The cistern is located beneath the Citadel.

==== Portuguese cistern ====
The semi-subterranean chamber has a roughly square plan measuring around 33 to 34 metres (108 to 112 ft) per side, was constructed with five rows of five stone pillars and columns. The chamber is built in a late Gothic style known as Manueline, with a vaulted ceiling of brick masonry and stone ribs. Its original function is not clear. It may have been an armory, barracks, or granary, but it is recorded as having been converted into a cistern in 1541. It was designed by an architect named Miguel de Arruda but the construction work was delegated to João de Castilho. A round opening in the center of the chamber served to collect rainwater. The cistern is famous especially for the thin layer of water that covers the floor and creates fine and ever-changing reflections in the otherwise dark vaulted chamber. Its visual qualities are such that several movies have been filmed within the cavernous space, of which Orson Welles' Othello is the best known internationally.

==== Churches ====
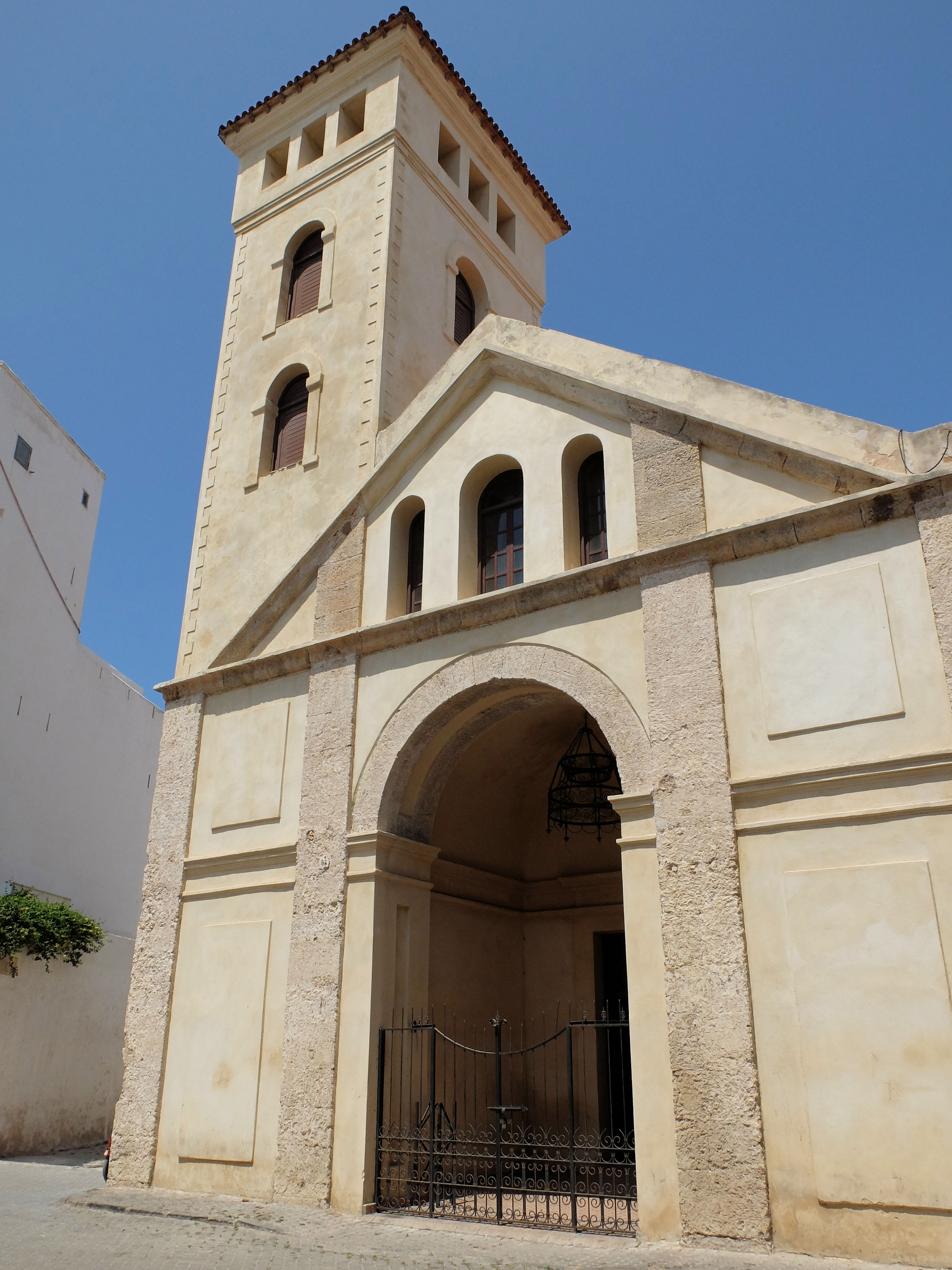
Church of Our Lady of Assumption

The Church of Our Lady of the Assumption, a prominent building located south of the Citadel, was the main parish church of the Portuguese settlement. It was constructed or begun when the fortress was expanded in 1541. It has a nave, a choir, a sacristy, and a square-shafted bell tower. At least three other churches existed, though generally only partial remains of them are still present today. Two small churches were adjoined to some of the bastions of the fortress. Another, the Church of Mercy (Misericórdia) was part of the Citadel.

==== Synagogues ====
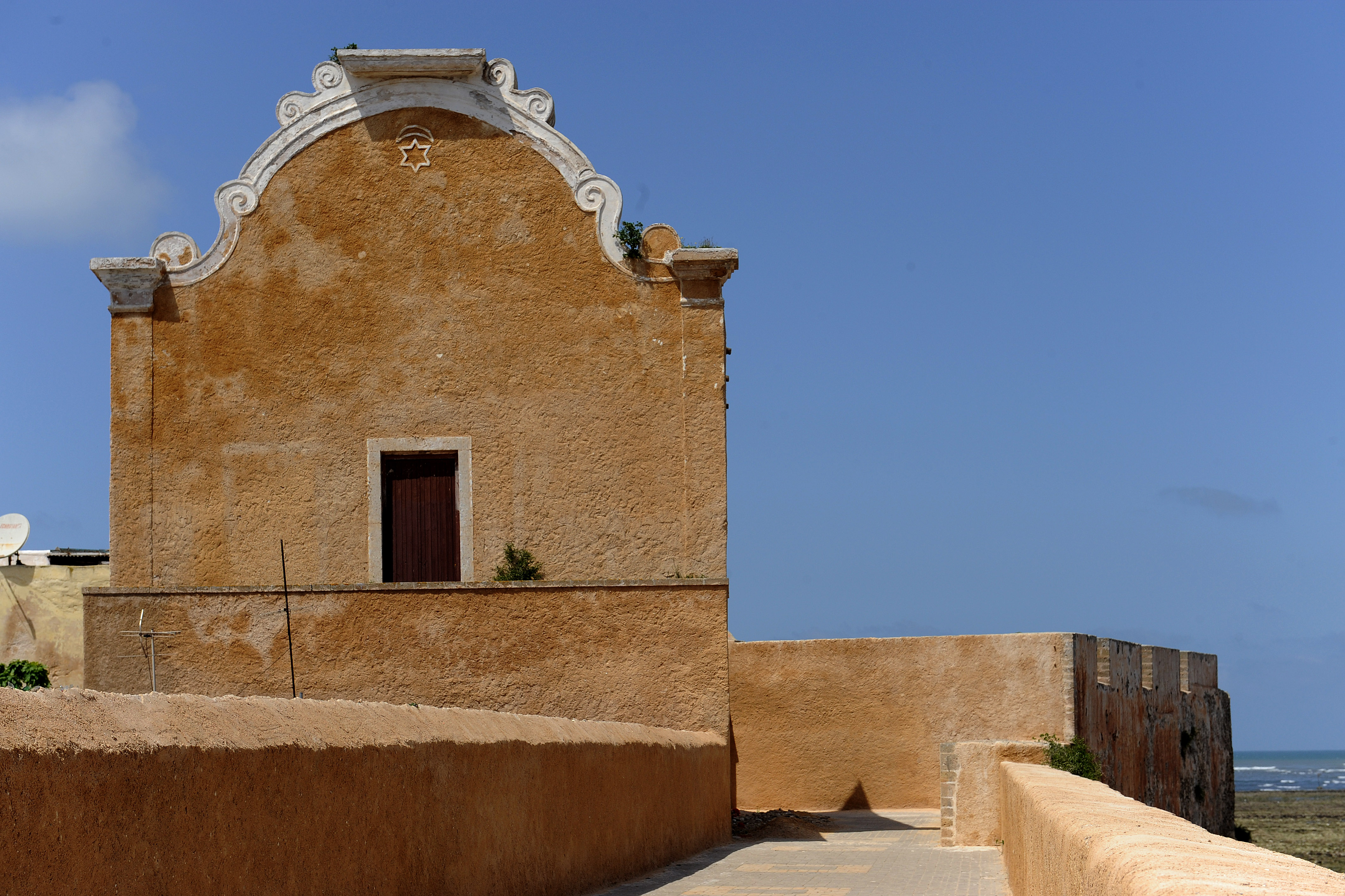
The Bensimon Synagogue, built along the northeastern ramparts

A number of synagogues also existed inside the old city, attesting to the importance of the Jewish community here in the 19th and 20th centuries. One prominently visible example is the Bensimon Synagogue, inaugurated in 1926 and attached to earlier structures in the northern corner of the former fortress. Its construction was sponsored by four brothers of the Bensimon family: Nessim, Messaoud, Abraham, and Mordechai.

=== Museum of Resistance and Independence ===
Located near the beach south of the old city and the port, this museum and exhibition space is dedicated to the memory of Moroccan soldiers and resistance to the French Protectorate regime. It is housed in a 20th-century colonial era building constructed in a "Mauresque" style.

== Climate ==
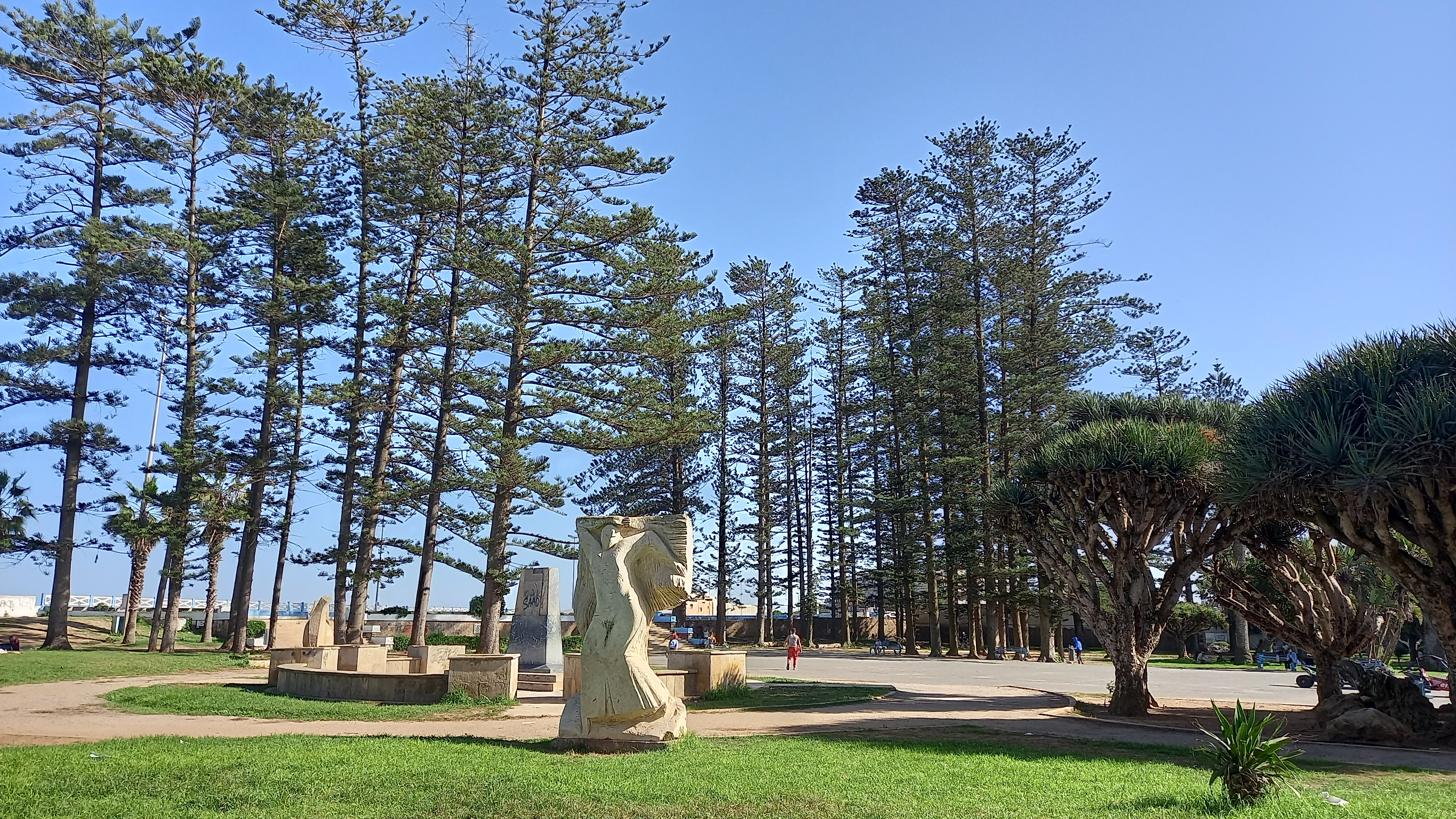
Mohammed V Park

El Jadida has a hot-summer Mediterranean climate (Köppen climate classification Csa). In winter there is more rainfall than in summer. The average annual temperature in El Jadida is 17.4 °C (63.3 °F). About 372 mm (14.65 in) of precipitation falls annually.

August is the warmest month of the year. The temperature in August averages 23.5 °C (74.3 °F). On average, the month of January is considered to be the coldest time of year with temperatures averaging at around 13.6 °C (56.5 °F).

There is a difference of 60 mm of precipitation between the driest and wettest months. The fluctuation of temperatures across the seasons is referred to as 9.8 °C (49.6 °F).

The month that sees the most relative humidity is January (80.13). The month with the lowest amount of relative humidity is May (72.59). The month with the highest amount of rainfall is December (7.33 days), whereas the one with the lowest precipitation level is July (0.20).

Climate data for El Jadida
Month	Jan	Feb	Mar	Apr	May	Jun	Jul	Aug	Sep	Oct	Nov	Dec	Year
Mean daily maximum °C (°F)	16.8 (62.2)	17.5 (63.5)	19.1 (66.4)	20.4 (68.7)	22.3 (72.1)	24.4 (75.9)	26.4 (79.5)	27.9 (82.2)	25.9 (78.6)	24.3 (75.7)	20.7 (69.3)	18.4 (65.1)	22.0 (71.6)
Mean daily minimum °C (°F)	7.6 (45.7)	7.7 (45.9)	9.3 (48.7)	10.9 (51.6)	13.2 (55.8)	15.9 (60.6)	17.7 (63.9)	18.9 (66.0)	16.9 (62.4)	14.7 (58.5)	11.3 (52.3)	9.0 (48.2)	12.8 (55.0)
Average precipitation mm (inches)	49 (1.9)	48 (1.9)	41 (1.6)	32 (1.3)	16 (0.6)	4 (0.2)	0 (0)	1 (0.0)	7 (0.3)	34 (1.3)	66 (2.6)	74 (2.9)	372 (14.6)
Source: climate-data.org

== Economy ==
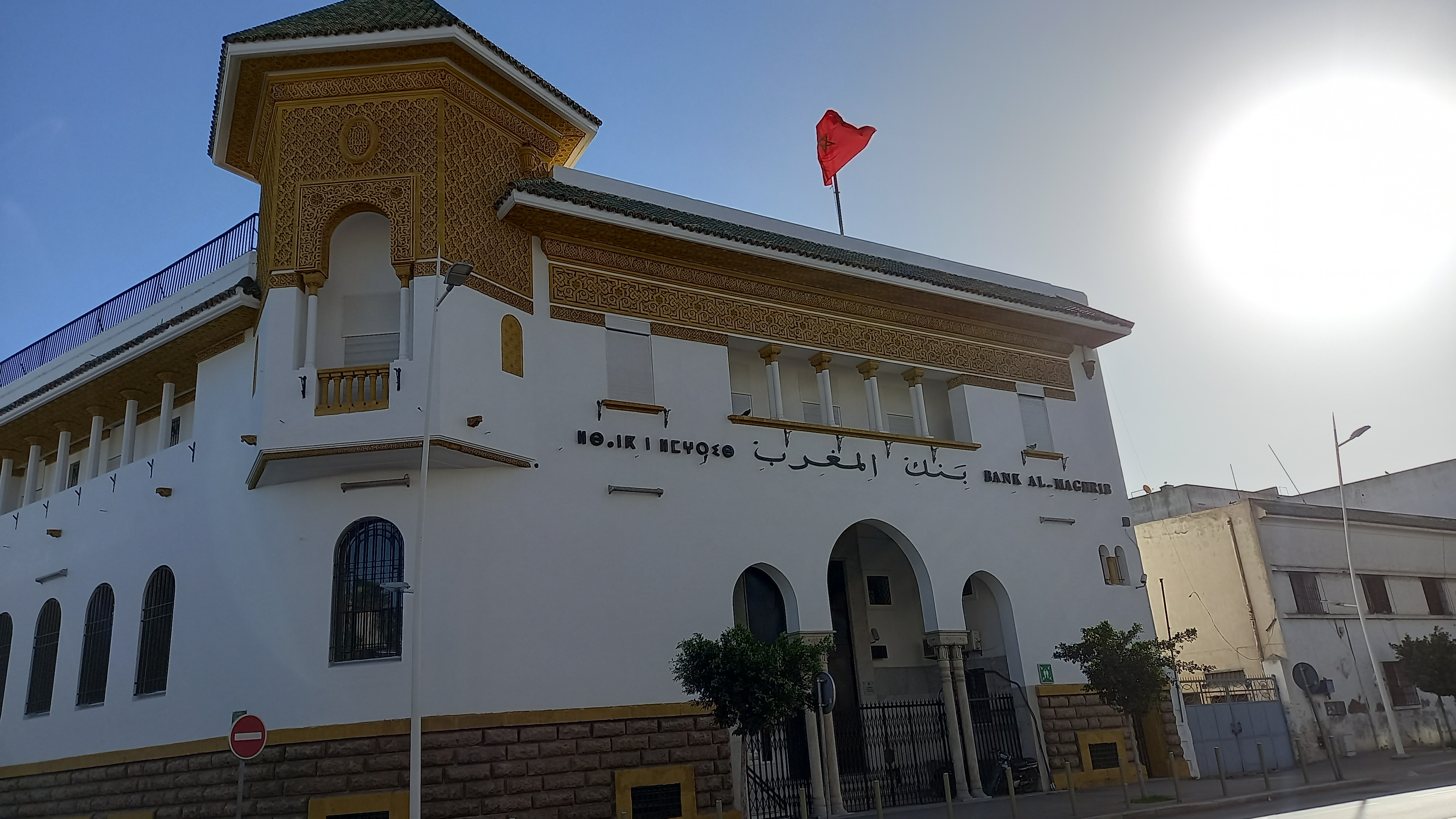
Bank Al-Maghrib branch at El Jadida

The city is a significant tourism destination thanks in part to its UNESCO-recognized historic heritage. A large five-star resort, the Mazagan Beach Resort, was opened in 2009 besides the nearby town of Azemmour, named in reference to the historic Portuguese fort. The resort was part of a wider strategy launched in 2001 by King Mohammed VI to boost tourism in Morocco by creating, with the help of foreign investors, large coastal resorts in El Jadida, Essaouira, Saïdia, and other cities on the Moroccan coast. The city is also a popular summer holiday resort for Moroccan families.

Since the 1980s the city's economy has benefited from the large industrial complex at Jorf Lasfar, located some 20 kilometres to the south. The complex, managed by the Office Chérifien des Phosphates, is the main processing center for the region's phosphate reserves and its port is used for exporting its related products. It also serves as a base for other industries.

== Education ==
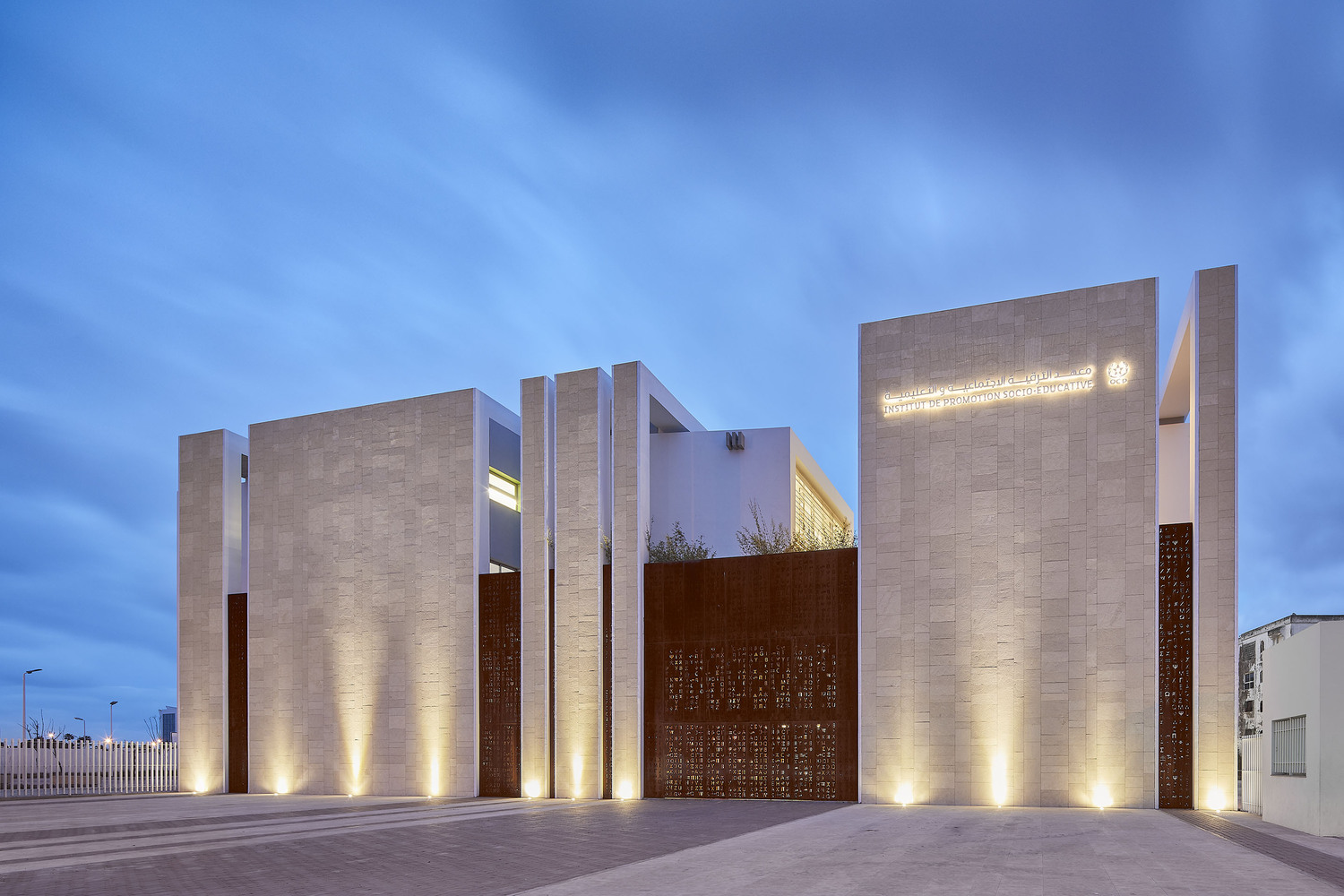
IPSE El Jadida

The city houses many post-secondary academic institutions:

Chouaib Doukkali University, including the following institutions:

- Faculty of Science
- Faculty of Letters and Humanities
- Faculty of Juridical, Economic and Social Sciences
- National School of Applied Sciences (ENSA)
- National School of Business and Management (ENCG)
- Superior School of Technology (EST) - Sidi Bennour (Outside El Jadida)

Office of Vocational Training and Promotion of Labor (OFPPT), including the following institutions:

- Professional Qualification Center (CQP)
- Specialized Institute of Applied Technology (ISTA) - Al-Massira
- Specialized Institute of Applied Technology (ISTA) - City-of-the-Air
- Specialized Institute of Hotel and Tourism Technology (ITHT) - El jadida
- Specialized Institute of Hotel and Tourism Technology (ITHT) - Al Haouzia

Others:

- Regional Centers for the Professions of Education and Training (CRMEF)
- Section of "Higher Technician Certificate" (BTS) (at ar-Razi Technical High-School)
- Section of "Preparatory Classes for Great Schools" (CPGE) (at ar-Razi Technical High-School)
- Higher Institute of Engineering and Business (ISGA) (private)

== Sports ==
The main football club of the city is Difaâ Hassani El Jadidi, currently playing in the Botola Pro 1.

== Nearby cities ==
Near El Jadida, are located the city of Azemmour in the northeast and the town of Sidi Bouzid in the southwest. Within a perimeter of around 120 km or less, are located Casablanca, Berrechid, Settat, Sidi Bennour, Oualidia, Youssoufia, Safi.

== Notable people ==
- Jaafar Aksikas, author
- Driss Chraïbi, author
- André Elbaz, painter and filmmaker
- André Guelfi, racing driver
- Zakaria Hadraf, footballer
- Driss Jettou, former prime minister, president of the Supreme Audit Court
- Youssef Kaddioui, former international footballer
- El Mehdi Karnass, footballer
- Abdelkebir Khatibi, author
- Abdellah Lahoua, footballer
- Yousra Mansour, vocalist of Bab L' Bluz
- Mohamed Nahiri, footballer
- Chaïbia Talal, painter
- Suleiman Zanfari, racing driver
- Nicola L, multidisciplinary artist
- Naji El-Mekki, pentathlete

== Twin towns – sister cities ==
El Jadida is twinned with:

- Arenzano, Italy (1964)
- Barcelos, Portugal (2009)
- Nabeul, Tunisia (1985)
- Sète, France (1992)
- Sintra, Portugal (1988)
- Varennes, Canada
- Vierzon, France (1987)
- Tacoma, United States (2007)

== See also ==
- Tourism in Morocco
- Sultan Mohammed ben Abdallah
