= Cadi Ayyad University =

University in Marrakesh, Morocco

- جامعة القاضي عياض
- Established: 1978; 48 years ago
- President: Pr. Moulay Lhassan HBID
- Academic staff: 1,519
- Administrative staff: 801
- Students: 102,000
- Location: Abdelkrim Khattabi Avenue, Marrakesh, Marrakesh-Safi, 40000, Morocco; 31.666°N 8.000°W
- Website: www.uca.ma

Cadi Ayyad University (Arabic: جامعة القاضي عياض, romanized: jāmiʿat al-qāḍī ʿayyāḍ, French: Université Cadi Ayyad), also known as the University of Marrakesh, is a public university in Morocco and one of the largest higher education institutions in the country.

Established in 1978, the university operates a network of institutions across the Marrakesh-Safi region, with campuses located in Marrakesh, Kalaat Sraghna, Essaouira and Safi.

Among its affiliated institutions is the École nationale des sciences appliquées de Marrakech (ENSA Marrakech), established in 2000 by the Ministry of Higher Education and specializing in engineering education and scientific research.

== Academic structure ==
Since its establishment in 1978, Cadi Ayyad University has developed a network of higher education institutions across the Marrakesh-Safi region. These include:

- Faculty of Sciences Semlalia (FSSM)
- Faculty of Letters and Human Sciences
- Faculty of Law, Economic and Social Sciences (FSJES)
- Faculty of Sciences and Techniques (FST)
- Faculty of Medicine and Pharmacy of Marrakesh (FMPM)
- National School of Applied Sciences of Marrakesh (ENSA-M)
- National School of Commerce and Management (ENCG)
- École normale supérieure (ENS) of Marrakesh
- École supérieure de technologie of Essaouira (ESTE)
- University Center of Kalaat Sraghna (CUKS) (2007–2008)
- École supérieure de technologie
- Faculté polydisciplinaire (2003–2004)
- National School of Applied Sciences of Safi (ENSA Safi) (2003–2004)

The number of students enrolled in Marrakesh is reported to be 41,669.

== Astronomy ==
As part of the Morocco Oukaimeden Sky Survey (MOSS) project, Cadi Ayyad University has contributed to the discovery of several astronomical objects, including comets and a near-Earth object (NEO). The university also lent its name to the asteroid 2007 NQ3, in reference to Cadi Ayyad.

The first major discovery was the comet P/2011 W2 (Rinner), observed on 25 November 2011 using a 500 mm telescope at the Oukaimeden Observatory. Another comet, C/2012 CH17 (MOSS), was identified in February 2012.

A near-Earth asteroid was also detected during the night of 15–16 November 2011 using a telescope associated with the MOSS project.

A third comet, initially designated P/2013 CE31, was discovered in January 2013 and later assigned a permanent designation.

== Notable alumni ==
- Khadijetou Lekweiry, virologist

== See also ==
- List of universities in Morocco
- Education in Morocco
