= Ibn Zohr University =

University in Agadir, Morocco

- جامعة ابن زهر ⵜⴰⵙⴷⴰⵡⵉⵜ ⵉⴱⵏ ⵥⵓⵀⵕ
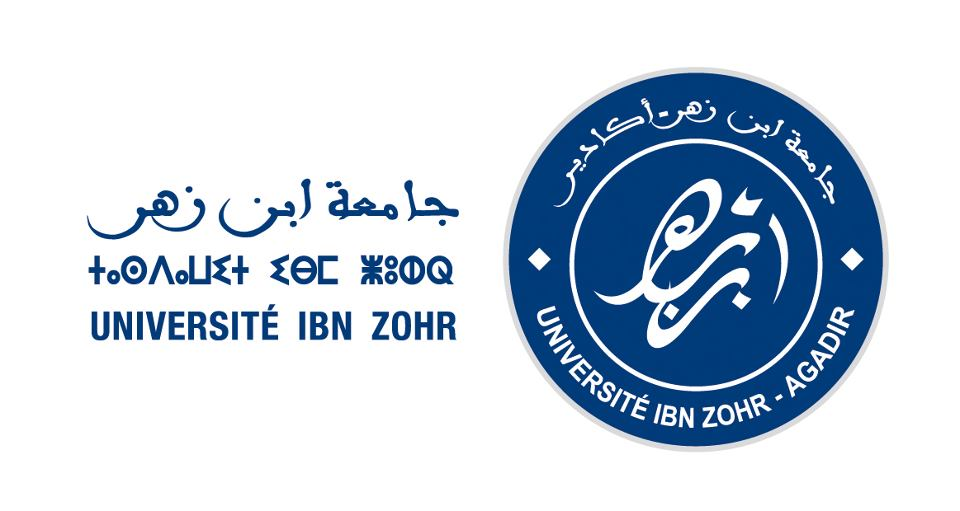
- Type: Public
- Established: 1989; 37 years ago
- President: Abdelaziz Bendou (2020-2025)
- Academic staff: 9
- Administrative staff: 1050
- Students: +130000
- Location: Agadir, Souss-Massa, Morocco
- Website: www.uiz.ac.ma

Ibn Zohr University is a public university in Agadir, Morocco.

== History ==
Created in 1989, the university takes its name from the Andalusian scholar Ibn Zhor el-Iyadi known as Avenzoar.

== Education ==
The university offers courses in the major disciplines of Science and Technology, Law and Economics, Letter and Human Sciences. It has nine faculties and six schools.The 163 courses are structured according to the LMD Higher Education Architecture - License, Master and PhD.
