= Abdelmalek Essaâdi University =

Moroccan public university

Coordinates: 35.562°N 5.363°W

- جامعة عبدالمالك السعدي
- Type: Public university
- Established: 1989; 37 years ago
- President: Dr. Bouchta El Moumni
- Location: Tétouan and Tangier, Morocco
- Website: www.uae.ac.ma

The Abdelmalek Essaâdi University is a Moroccan public university established in 1989 and headquartered in Tétouan. It is one of the main higher education institutions in northern Morocco.

The university comprises 15 institutions, including faculties, schools, and institutes, distributed across the Tanger-Tétouan-Al Hoceïma region as well as in the city of Larache. It offers programs in several fields, including sciences, law, economics and management, humanities and social sciences, as well as science and technology.

In 2016, the university inaugurated a Confucius Institute dedicated to the teaching of Chinese language and culture, becoming the third institute of this type in Morocco.

The university was ranked 82nd in the 2016 regional ranking of Arab universities published by U.S. News & World Report.

== History ==
Abdelmalek Essaâdi University was founded by virtue of Dahir no. 189-144 dated 23 Rabia Ier 1410 (23 October 1989) completed by Dahir no. 177-398 of 16 October 1975 relating to the creation of universities.

The name of the university was given in honor of the Saadian Sultan Abu Marwan Abd al-Malik whose troops were victorious at the battle of Oued El-Makhazine also called Battle of the Three Kings against the King of Portugal Sebastian I and his allies and located next to Ksar El Kébir

Carried out from a first nucleus installed in 1982, the creation of the Abdelmalek Essaâdi University came at an opportune moment when Morocco had undertaken, both economically and politically, a regionalization strategy, aimed at strengthening decentralization, by creating a university nucleus whose primary purpose is to adapt the potential in terms of training and research to the specific needs of the North-West region.

== University components ==
In addition to the Presidency, the UAE currently has 15 institutions, namely: six schools and nine faculties. In addition, 2 schools and 6 faculties will soon be opened.

Present in five cities (Tetouan, Tangier, Larache, Al Hoceïma and Ksar El-Kébir), and soon in Chefchaouen and Ouezzane as well, the number of its students exceeded during the year (2020–2021) the threshold of 123,000, including 4,600 doctoral students, with a supervision of 1197 teacher-researchers and 602 administrative and technicians.

== Organization ==
The university includes the following faculties and schools.

In Tétouan:

- Faculty of Sciences
- National School of Applied Sciences, Tétouan Campus

In Martil:

- Faculty of Juridical, Economic, and Social Sciences (FSJES)
- Higher Normal School, Ecole Normale Supérieure (ENS)
- Faculty of Letters and Humanities

In Tangier:

- National School of Applied Sciences, Tangier Campus
- National School of Business and Management of Tangier
- Faculty of Sciences and Technology

The National Schools and the faculty of science and technology deliver a state engineering degree (Diplôme d'Ingénieur d'État). The other faculties deliver either a bachelor's (licence) or a master's degree.

In Al Hoceima:

- National School of Applied Sciences, Al Hoceima Campus
- Faculty of Sciences and Technology

== Teaching and Research ==
=== Training ===
The university's initial and continuing education programs are aimed at all audiences and offer accredited training in many areas. The training at the UAE is essentially organized according to the pedagogical architecture of higher education LMD (License - Master - Doctorate) is organized in 4 disciplinary fields: Sciences and Techniques, Law, Economics and Management, Human Sciences, Letters and Arts and Medical and Pharmaceutical Sciences. The university prepares training offers according to the Bachelor framework for accreditation and start of application from the start of the 2021–2022 academic year.

The 14 types of diplomas prepared are as follows:

1. DUT: University Diploma in Technology
2. LEF: License of Fundamental Studies
3. LE: Education License
4. LP: Professional License
5. LST: Bachelor of Science and Technology
6. LP-FUE: Professional License - University Education Stream
7. M: Master
8. MS: Specialized Master
9. MST: Master in Science and Technology
10. MS-FUE: Specialized Master - University Education Stream
11. DI: Engineer diploma
12. DT: Diploma of Translator
13. DEncg: Diploma from ENCG
14. DDM: Diploma of Doctor of Medicine

The United Arab Emirates has expanded its research capacity through structural reforms focused on national and regional research priorities. These initiatives include the reorganization of research laboratories, teams, and academic units, as well as the consolidation of existing doctoral training programs into Doctoral Studies Centers (CED).

Research at UAE is now structured within 5 CEDs, 38 laboratories, 20 groups and 52 research teams accredited by the University Council (CU). For its part, research and international cooperation have been defined in the university's development strategy as priorities. It is the guarantor of training and research with an international dimension allowing the university to welcome and train foreign students and to offer its students and staff the opportunity of a departure towards other cultures, with a very present African dimension.

=== Digital presence ===
The university provides students with a web platform providing resources (PDF courses, videos, etc.) for all branches of study.

A messaging system is also available.

== University centers ==
=== Confucious Institute ===
The Confucius Institute inaugurated in 2016, is the 3rd Confucius Institute in Morocco with the objective of learning the Chinese language. The result of a partnership between UAE, Jiangxi Normal University of Science and Technology (China), HANBAN and the General Directorate of Confucius Institutes. Since its inception, 2,308 students have registered for Chinese language and culture courses, including 308 ISITT students.

=== Career center ===
The Career Center was created in 2016 with the aim of offering UAE students training in "Soft-Skills" non-technical skills and facilitating their access to employability after their university studies. More than 15,000 students have benefited from its physical services and nearly 200,000 virtual users have registered on the careercenter.ma platform, which has received more than 1,915,000 visits.

=== 3D Prototyping and Additive Manufacturing Center ===
The center uses computer-aided design, engineering, manufacturing and materials science technologies to transform a 3D model into a physical object.

=== Metallurgy and Plastics Center ===
The objective is to develop applied research meeting the needs to support regional and national socio-economic development.

=== Human Center ===
A center created to support all components of the university and instill a spirit of tolerance, multiculturalism, law and duty.

== Student life ==
=== Student representation and associations ===
Several associations and clubs active in sport, charity work, art, journalism, innovation and entrepreneurship are present in the various schools and institutions of the university. In particular, the branches of:

- Enactus
- Lions
- CMD
- JCI

There is also a Student Office in all components of the UAE, which oversees the protection of student rights and the transmission of information to the administrative body.

=== Demographic evolution ===
1982	1995	2011	2021
3000 students	7800 students	20000 students	123000 students

== Presidents history ==
- 2002 – 2010: Mustapha Bennouna
- 2010 – 2019: Houdaifa Ameziane
- 2019 – 2020: Mohamed Errami
- 2020 – Now: Bouchta El Moumni

== Administration and services ==
=== Administration ===
The university is administered by:

- The University Council (Board of Directors), a decision-making body that participates in the application of university policy. It is made up of 78 members, including 50 elected by direct suffrage and 7 representatives of the socio-economic sector;
- The committees (education and research), which ensure consistency and articulation between training and research policies;
- The Technical Committee, which is the consultation body concerning the operation and organization of services;
- The Joint Committees by body (6 including 3 elected) consulted on decisions concerning members of the administrative and teaching staff;
- The Management Board: which discusses and proposes to the Board the breakdown of the university's budget, recruitment, and financial policy, 10 people including 5 elected;
- The Cultural and Sports Activities Committee supporting staff for their development;
- The QSH Committee (in the process of being set up) for the protection of the health and safety of officers, the improvement of their working conditions and the protection of the environment.

=== Direction ===
- President of the university: Bouchta El Moumni
- Vice-president Educational Affairs: Jamal Eddine Benhayoune
- Vice-president Research and Cooperation: Hind Cherkaoui Dekkaki
- General Secretary: Barbara Choukri
- Economic service: Abdelhay Harrak

== Personalities linked to the university ==
Mohamed Errami, former president who put the interest of the university before his own health during the COVID-19 period

Mohamed Mechbal, research professor who won the King Faisal International Prize for Arabic Language and Literature in February 2021

== Partnerships ==
Abdelmalek Essaâdi University has signed agreements with its international counterparts. It is an effective partner of more than 32 universities around the world, and foresees a number of 50 in 2023. The partnership with the socioeconomic fabric on a multidimensional scale is very present.

== International rankings ==
The university appears in several international rankings:

- Top 33% of universities in the world in 2021 according to EduRank
- 146th in Africa in the 2020 ranking of Webometrics
- 136th at the African level in the "QS world university ranking 2018”
- 82nd in the 2016 regional ranking of Arab universities (U.S. News & World Report)
- 2301st worldwide in the university ranking by academic performance (URAP)

== Key figures ==
- 6 Cities
- 6 Schools
- 8 Campuses
- 9 Faculties
- 49 Nationalities
- 618 Administrators and engineers
- 1218 Research professors
- 123,000 Students

== See also ==
- List of universities in Morocco
- Education in Morocco
