= List of universities in Morocco =

This is a list of notable public and private universities in Morocco. The higher education system in Morocco comprises 13 public universities, 8 private universities, and 211 private institutes and schools. Public universities are free, except for Al Akhawayn University and the International University of Rabat, which are tuition-based. Higher education is governed by the Ministry of Higher Education, Research, and Training.

== Casablanca-Settat ==
Location	Name	Founded	Type
Casablanca	École d'ingénierie en génie des systèmes industriels	1901	Private
Casablanca	Hassan II University of Casablanca	1975	Public
Casablanca	Institut supérieur du génie appliqué	1981	Private
Casablanca	Institut supérieur d'ingénierie et des affaires	1981	Private
Casablanca	École marocaine des sciences de l'ingénieur	1986	Private
Casablanca	Hautes études commerciales et informatiques	1986	Private
Casablanca	HEM Business School	1988	Private for profit
Casablanca	École de management	1992	Private
Casablanca	Université Mundiapolis	1996	Private
Casablanca	École d'architecture de Casablanca	2004	Private
Casablanca	Institut supérieur du transport et de la logistique	2006	Private
Casablanca	HESTIM Engineering and Business School	2006	Private
Casablanca	École supérieure de management et de gestion des ressources humaines	2009	Private
Casablanca	Université internationale de Casablanca	2010	Private
Casablanca	École centrale de Casablanca	2013	Public
Casablanca	Mohammed VI University of Health Sciences	2014	Private
Casablanca	École supérieure des sciences économiques & de management	2014	Private
Casablanca	Ecole supérieure en ingénierie, télécoms, management et génie civil		Private
Casablanca	Ecole supérieure des sciences de la santé		Private
Settat	Hassan I University	1997	Public
El Jadida	Chouaib Doukkali University	1985	Public

== Rabat-Salé-Kénitra ==
Location	Name	Founded	Type
Rabat	Institut scientifique de Rabat	1920	Public
Rabat	École nationale supérieure de l'administration	1948	Public
Rabat	Mohammed V University	1957	Public
Rabat	Mohammadia School of Engineering	1960	Public
Rabat	National Institute of Statistics and Applied Economics	1961	Public
Rabat	National Institute of Posts and Telecommunications	1961	Public
Rabat	Institut supérieur de l'information et de la communication	1969	Public
Rabat	École nationale supérieure des mines de Rabat	1972	Public
Rabat	École des sciences de l'information	1975	Public
Rabat	National School of Architecture	1980	Public
Rabat	École marocaine des sciences de l'ingénieur	1986	Private
Rabat	International Institute for Higher Education in Morocco	1988	Private
Rabat	École nationale supérieure d'informatique et d'analyse des systèmes	1992	Public
Rabat	Institut supérieur d'ingénierie et des affaires	1996	Private
Rabat	École supérieure d'optique de Rabat	1997	Private
Rabat	École supérieure de management, d'informatique et de télécommunication	2006	Private
Rabat	École marocaine d'ingénierie	2008	Private
Rabat	International University of Rabat	2010	Private
Rabat	University Mohammed VI Polytechnic	2013	Private
Rabat	Institut supérieur de management d'administration et de génie informatique	2013	Private
Rabat	École Supérieure des Sciences et Technologies de l'Ingénierie	2013	Private
Rabat	Al-Zahrawi International University of Health Sciences	2014	Semi-public
Rabat	Institut spécialisés dans les métiers de l'offshoring et les nouvelles technologies de l'information		
Rabat	Mohammed VI University of Health Sciences		
Rabat	Institut supérieur des hautes études en développement durable		Private
Rabat	Institut Mohammed VI des lectures et études coraniques		
Rabat	École supérieure de Rabat en management et ingénierie		Private
Kenitra	Université Ibn-Tufayl	1989	Public

== Marrakesh-Safi ==
Location	Name	Founded	Type
Marrakesh	Cadi Ayyad University	1978	Public
Marrakesh	École marocaine des sciences de l'ingénieur	1986	Private
Marrakesh	Sup de Co Marrakech	1987	Private
Marrakesh	Hautes études économiques, commerciales et d'ingénierie	1997	Private
Marrakesh	Private University of Marrakech	2005	Private
Marrakesh	Institut supérieur d'ingénierie et des affaires	2005	Private
Benguerir	University Mohammed VI Polytechnic	2013	Private

== Fez-Meknes ==
Location	Name	Founded	Type
Fez	University of al-Qarawiyyin	859	Public
Fez	Sidi Mohamed Ben Abdellah University	1975	Public
Fez	École des hautes études comptables et financières	2004	Private
Fez	Private University of Fes	2006	Private
Fez	Institut supérieur d'ingénierie et des affaires	2008	Private
Fez	Ecole supérieure de management de commerce et d'informatique	1992	Private
Fez	Euro-Mediterranean University of Morocco	2014	Private
Meknes	Moulay Ismail University	1989	Public
Ifrane	Al Akhawayn University	1995	Private

== Tanger-Tétouan-Al Hoceima ==
Location	Name	Founded	Type
Tétouan	Abdelmalek Essaâdi University	1989	Public
Tanger	École marocaine des sciences de l'ingénieur	1986	Private
Tanger	École des nouvelles sciences et ingénierie	2004	Private

== Souss-Massa ==
Location	Name	Founded	Type
Agadir	Ibn Zohr University	1989	Public
Agadir	Universiapolis - Université internationale d'Agadir	1989	Private
Agadir	École de management et d’administration des affaires	2008	Private

== Beni-Mellal-Khénifra ==
Location	Name	Founded	Type
Béni Mellal	Université Sultan Moulay Slimane	2007	Public

== Oriental ==
Location	Name	Founded	Type
Oujda	Mohammed First University	1978	Public
Oujda	École des hautes études d'ingénierie	2009	Private

== Laâyoune-Sakia El Hamra ==
Location	Name	Founded	Type
Laayoune	University Mohammed VI Polytechnic	2013	Private

== Dakhla-Oued Ed-Dahab ==
Location	Name	Founded	Type
Dakhla	Mohammed VI University of Health Sciences	2014	Private

== See also ==
- Conservatories of Morocco
- Information technology in Morocco
- Science and technology in Morocco
