= Instituto Español Juan Ramón Jiménez =

Spanish international school in Morocco

- Arabic: البعثة الإسبانیة خوان رامون خمینیز; French: Institut Espagnol Juan Ramon Jiménez
- Casablanca; Morocco

Information
- School type: International School
- Established: 1967
- Language: Spanish

The Instituto Español Juan Ramón Jimenez (IEJRZ; Arabic: البعثة الإسبانیة خوان رامون خمینیز; French: Institut Espagnol Juan Ramon Jiménez) is a Spanish international school in Casablanca, Morocco, operated by the Spanish Ministry of Education. It is named after the Spanish poet Juan Ramón Jiménez.

== History and operations ==
Created by decree #2747/1967 of 16 November 1967, the school occupies a building which opened on 2 May 1972. It serves levels educación infantil, until bachillerato.

As of 1998, 65 percent of the students were Moroccans, 30 percent were Spanish, and less than 5 percent were other nationalities.

== See also ==
- Education in Morocco
- List of international schools
- List of schools in Morocco
