= Jean-Noël Ferrié =

French political scientist and sociologist

- Born: January 16, 1959 (age 67); France
- Occupations: Political scientist and sociologist
- Notable work: L'Egypte entre démocratie et islamisme

Jean-Noël Ferrié (born 1959) is a French political scientist and sociologist.

== Education ==
Jean-Noël Ferrié has a PhD (1993) in political science from the Aix-en-Provence Institute of Political Science in France and a DEA (Diplôme d'Etudes Approfondies) in biological and medical anthropology (1988) and in political development in the Arab World (1987).

== Career in research and academia ==
Jean-Noël Ferrié, a political scientist and sociologist, is the director of research at the National Center for Scientific Research (CNRS- France). He is currently the director of the Rabat Institute of Political Science (Sciences Po Rabat) and the director of the Laboratory of Political Science, Humanities and Social Sciences at the International University of Rabat (Université Internationale de Rabat). He also codirects the international laboratory affiliated with CNRS: "Inequality, development and political equilibrium" (LIA IDE).

Jean-Noël Ferrié was an associate director of the Jacques-Berque Center in Rabat (2010–2014), member of the PACTE laboratory at the Grenoble Institute of Political Science (2007–2010), cooperation attaché at the Embassy of France in Kabul (2006–2007), contracted researcher with the Ministry of Foreign Affairs in the Center for Legal, Economic, and Social Studies (CEDEJ) in Cairo (2001–2006), editor in chief of Annuaire de l'Afrique du Nord at the Institute of Studies and Research on the Arab and Muslim world (IREMAM, CNRS) (1998–2002), contracted researcher with the Ministry of Foreign Affairs in the Center for Legal, Economic, and Social Studies (CEDEJ) in Cairo (1994–1997) after having stayed there as a graduate of the Michel-Seurat Scholarship of CNRS (1993–1994). Furthermore, he taught in the francophone program of Political Science at the University of Cairo (2001–2006), and he was a visiting professor at Saint-Joseph University in Beirut (2001–2004).

== Selected works ==
- Morocco in the Present (with A. Boutaleb, B. Dupret and Z. Rhani, in French), 2015
- Deliberating under the Dome. Parliamentary activity in authoritarian regimes (with baudouin Dupret, in French), 2014
- Media, wars, and identity. Practices, communicational practices in political, ethnic, and religious affiliation in the Arab World ((co-directed avec B. Dupret, in French), 2008
- [https://www.cairn.info/l-egypte-entre-democratie-et-islamisme--9782746711907.htm [[Egypt]] between democracy and islamism. The Moubarak system at the time of succession]] (in French), 2008
- The regime of Civility. Public et Reislamization in Egypt (in French), 2004
- Democratic and authoritarian systems in North Africa (in French), 2006
- [http://www.karthala.com/1483-la-religion-de-la-vie-quoditienne-chez-les-marocains-musulmans-9782845865655.html Everyday life [[Religion]] of Moroccan muslims. Rituales, rules and routine]] (in French), 2004
