= EUROSCI Network =

The EUROSCI Network is an international academic network that promotes university co-operation through educational technology. Following a series of seminars co-funded by Erasmus+ at the University of A Coruña in Spain starting in 2011, the network was formally established on 1 September 2016. It brings together individual academics and educational institutions such as universities and business schools. The major focus is on international co-operation, teacher training, online presence management, sponsorship brokerage, and quality assurance. Eurosci has organised conferences, teacher training courses, language courses, and several editions of an EU-funded open online course of European integration. It has also promoted outreach activities at other educational levels, such as secondary school.

== Institutional partners ==
The Network is underpinned by institutional partners distributed across different countries of Europe, Africa and South America:

Country	Institutions
Brazil	Methodist University of Piracicaba
Brazil	Methodist University of Sao Paulo
Colombia	Catholic University of Colombia
Germany	University of Siegen
Spain	University of A Coruña
Spain	University of Santiago de Compostela
Greece	University of Thessaly
Ireland	Dublin City University
Italy	University of Palermo
Libya	University of Benghazi
Libya	University of Sebha
Libya	University of Tripoli
Morocco	HESTIM Engineering and Business School
Poland	Lublin University of Technology
Romania	National School of Political Science and Public Administration
Romania	Alexandru Ioan Cuza University
Romania	Politehnica University of Bucharest
Romania	Ștefan cel Mare University of Suceava
Romania	Gheorghe Asachi Technical University of Iași
Ukraine	Odesa University
Ukraine	Chernivtsi University
United Kingdom	Royal Holloway, University of London
United Kingdom	University of South Wales
