= Bouchra Baibanou =

First Moroccan summiteer of the Seven Summits

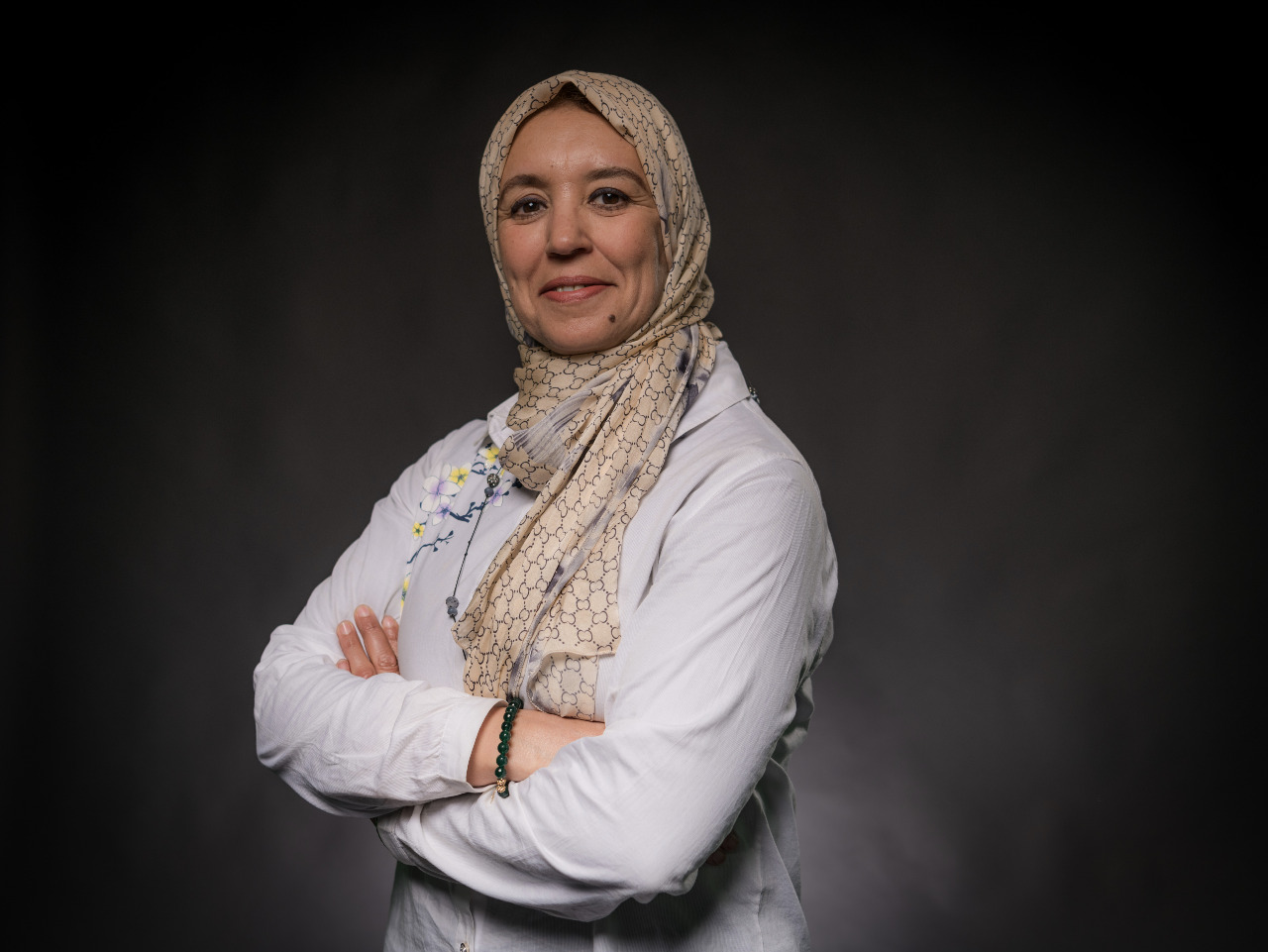
- Born: 1969 (age 56–57); Rabat
- Education: National Institute of Posts and Telecommunications
- Occupations: Mountaineer, Engineer
- Known for: First Moroccan to climb the Seven Summits
- Spouse: Lahoucine Ouboumalk
- Children: 1, Hiba

Bouchra Baibanou (born 1969, Rabat) is a Moroccan alpinist and motivational speaker. She is the first Moroccan woman to summit Mount Everest, and in 2017 she became the first Moroccan to complete the Seven Summits.

== Biography ==
Baibanou grew up in Rabat, the daughter of a mechanic and a stay at home mother. As a young girl, she loved karate and reading Jules Verne novels. After going trekking at summer camp aged 10, she fell in love with the outdoors. Originally wanting to be an astronomer, she turned to studying physics at Mohammed V University when her visa was refused. She later received a degree in telecommunications engineering at the National Institute of Posts and Telecommunications (INPT) in Rabat.

In 1995, when Baibanou was 25, she climbed her first peak, Toubkal (4,167 metres [13,671 ft]), the tallest peak in the Atlas Mountains. The experience encouraged her to continue mountaineering.

In 1999, she and her husband Lahoucine Ouboumalk climbed Toubkal again for their honeymoon.

In 2002, she and her family moved to Canada where she pursued a degree in management from HEC in Montreal, Canada. After returning to Morocco, she worked as a software engineer for the Moroccan Ministry of Equipment, Transport and Logistics.

In 2009, she established Delta Évasion, offering hikes around Morocco for tourists and to support local people. While taking international tourists on treks across Morocco, they would tell her about climbing trips to Mont Blanc, Kilimanjaro and the Himalayas. Their stories piqued her interest, and gave her the thought to begin climbing outside Morocco.

=== Mountaineering ===
In March 2011, she summited Mount Kilimanjaro (5,895 metres [19,341 ft]) while on an expedition with her husband. At Kiliminjaro, she met Singaporean alpinist, Khoo Swee Chiow, who invited her to climb Mont Blanc (4,810 metres [15,780 ft]). After training with Chiow, in June that year, she reached the summit.

After climbing Kiliminjaro and Mont Blanc, at age 42 she decided to pursue the Seven Summits, to reach the highest point on each continent. Next, she climbed Mount Elbrus in June 2012, Aconcagua and Denali in June 2014 and then Puncak Jaya in November 2015.

While climbing, Baibanou's husband Houcine would watch their daughter when on expeditions. Baibanou is a practicing Muslim and wears a headscarf by choice, as well as during her climbs. While advocating for women's and gender equality with her climbs, she does not consider herself a "feminist" instead defining herself as a "free woman".

In April 2017, she launched an expedition to Mount Everest, her second to last peak for the seven summits. On May 21 at 9 in the morning, she reached the summit, becoming the first Moroccan and North African woman to do so.

In December 2018, she reached the summit of Antarctica's Mount Vinson, her final peak to complete all seven summits.

In reaching the top, she became the first person from Morocco to complete the seven summits, and only the second Arab woman to do so.

=== After the Seven Summits ===
In 2020, she turned to mountaineering full time, teaching climbing and motivational speaking. She is a member of the Royal Moroccan Federation of Skiing and Mountain Sports and is the president of « Delta Evasion », a project to develop mountain sports in Morocco.

In 2021, Baibanou published My path to the seven summits of the world French: Mon chemin vers les sept sommets du monde.

After completing the Seven Summits, Baibanou continues to climb, in an effort to inspire young Arab girls to achieve their dreams. On July 28, 2022, she reached the summit of K2 (8,611 metres [28,251 ft]), one of the most challenging peaks in the world. She was the first Arab woman to reach the summit.

=== Awards and honors ===
She received the Order of Ouissam Alaouite from the Moroccan King Mohammed VI in August 2015.
