= Karima Dirèche =

French Algerian historian

- Education: University of Provence (Ph.D.); Aix-Marseille University (Habilitation)
- Occupation: Historian
- Employer: CNRS
- Known for: Contemporary history of the Maghreb

Karima Dirèche is a French Algerian historian specialising in the contemporary history of the Maghreb. From September 2013 to August 2017, she has been the director of the Institute for Research on the Contemporary Maghreb in Tunis.

== Education ==
Dirèche studied history and philosophy at the University of Provence, earning a doctorate in 1992 with a thesis on emigration from Kabylie to France. She has academic qualifications in historical geography and in history. Her habilitation thesis on Fabriquer de l’histoire et créer du sens. Enjeux mémoriels et affirmations identitaires dans l’Afrique post-indépendante ("To manufacture history and create meaning. Issues of memory and affirmations of identity in post-independence Africa") was accepted at Aix-Marseille University in 2012 and constitutes a critical historiographic analysis of national narratives in Algerian society since 1962.

== Career ==
Dirèche is a research director at the Centre national de la recherche scientifique. After teaching in colleges and public lycées, she joined CNRS in 2005 as a researcher at the TELEMME centre (French: Temps Espaces et Langages, Europe Méridionale, Méditerranée: "Time, Space and Languages: Southern and Mediterranean Europe") at the Maison méditerranéenne des sciences de l'homme in Aix-en-Provence.

She has taught at the School for Advanced Studies in the Social Sciences in Paris, the University of Aix-Marseille and the School of Government and Economy in Rabat, and served as research director at the Institute of Political Sciences at the International University of Rabat.

Her research focusses on migration (of Algerians and Comoro Islanders) in the colonial and post-colonial periods and has included issues of post-independence historical narrative in the Maghreb, issues of religion (Judaism, Christianity, and conversion) in Algeria and Morocco, and the question of Berber identity. Her recent research has focussed on two issues: neo-evangelical conversion in the Maghreb and the resultant political and religious issues, and Jewish memory in contemporary Algeria.

== Other activities ==
- European Council on Foreign Relations (ECFR), Member
