= Private University of Marrakech =

Private university in Marrakesh, Morocco

Coordinates: 31.515°N 8.061°W

- Université Privée de Marrakech
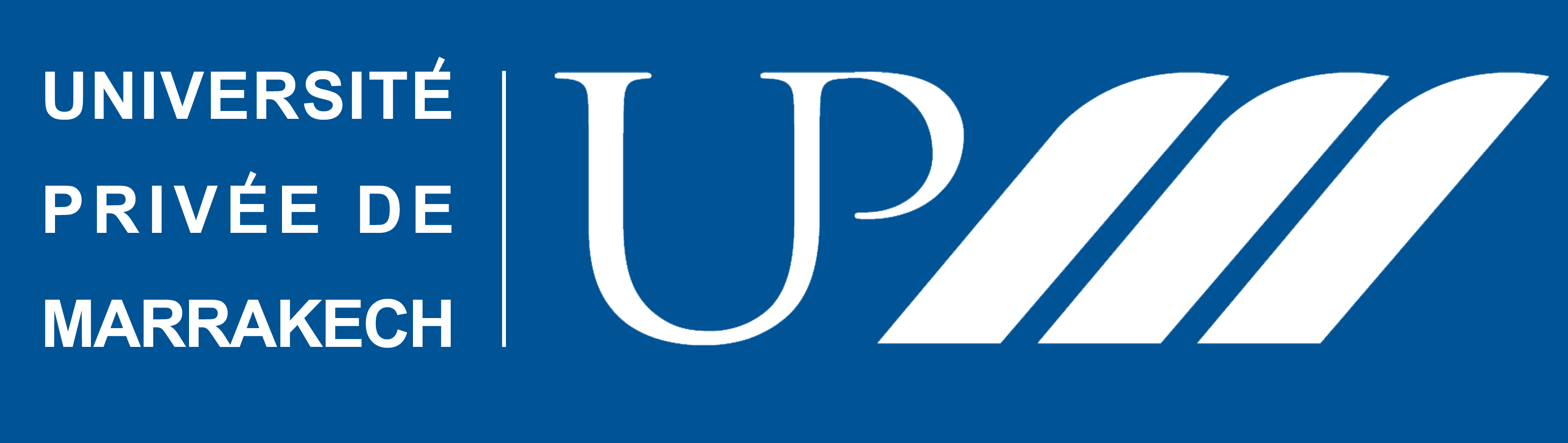
- Type: Private university
- Established: 2005
- President: Professor Mohamed Knidiri
- Students: 1,600 (2011)
- Location: Marrakesh, Morocco
- Campus: Km 13, Route d'Amizmiz - 42312, Marrakesh
- Language: French, English, Spanish, Arabic
- Website: upm.ac.ma

The Private University of Marrakech (UPM) is a private university in Marrakesh, Morocco. It was founded in 2005.

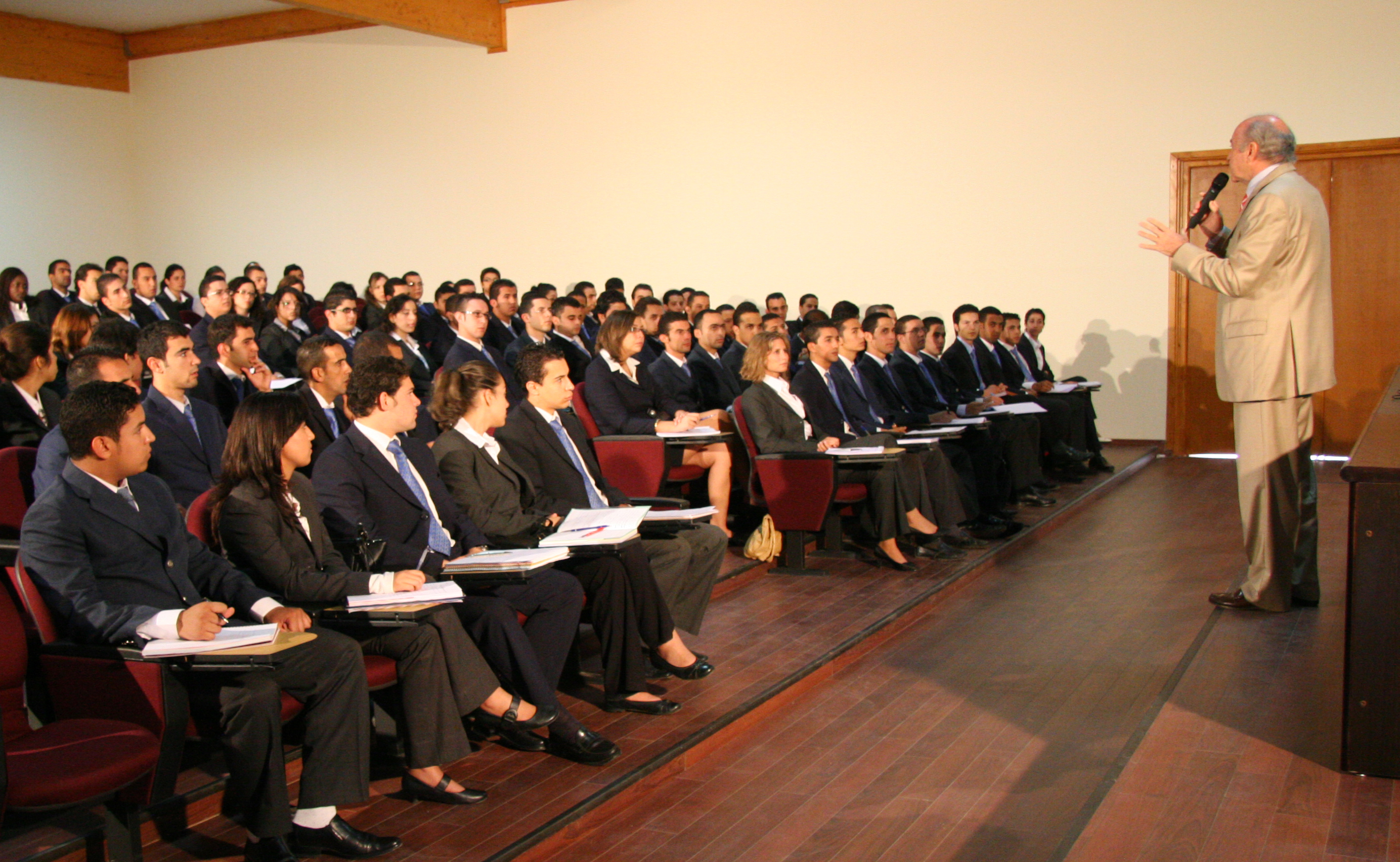
UPM Marrakech

== History ==
UPM was established in 2005 by Mohamed Kabbadj.

In 2012, it received official accreditation from the Moroccan Ministry of Higher Education as a private university.

Development Partners International (DPI), a London-based investment fund, acquired shares in 2014, followed by Mediterrania Capital Partners (MCP), a regional investment fund, in 2016, in the KMR Holding Pédagogique created in 2014 by Mohamed Kabbadj.

In 2015, UPM expanded to Senegal with the acquisition of St Christopher School of Medicine.

In 2017, UPM received recognition from the Moroccan Ministry of Higher Education, allowing it to have its accredited degrees recognized as equivalent to state degrees. The following year, UPM acquired the International University of Casablanca.

In 2019, a subsidiary of the World Bank Group dedicated to the private sector (International Finance Corporation, IFC) granted a loan of 14 million euros to UPM's holding company, with the launch of a private faculty of medicine in Marrakech and the development of the medical university in Dakar.

== Academic programs ==
UPM offers programs organized into seven training areas:

- Tourism, Hospitality & Lifestyle
- Business & Governance
- Engineering & Innovation
- Medicine
- Health
- Sport
- Digital, Media, Arts & Culture

The Bachelor's, Master's, Engineering, and Doctor of Medicine degrees awarded by UPM are equivalent to state degrees.

== Campuses ==
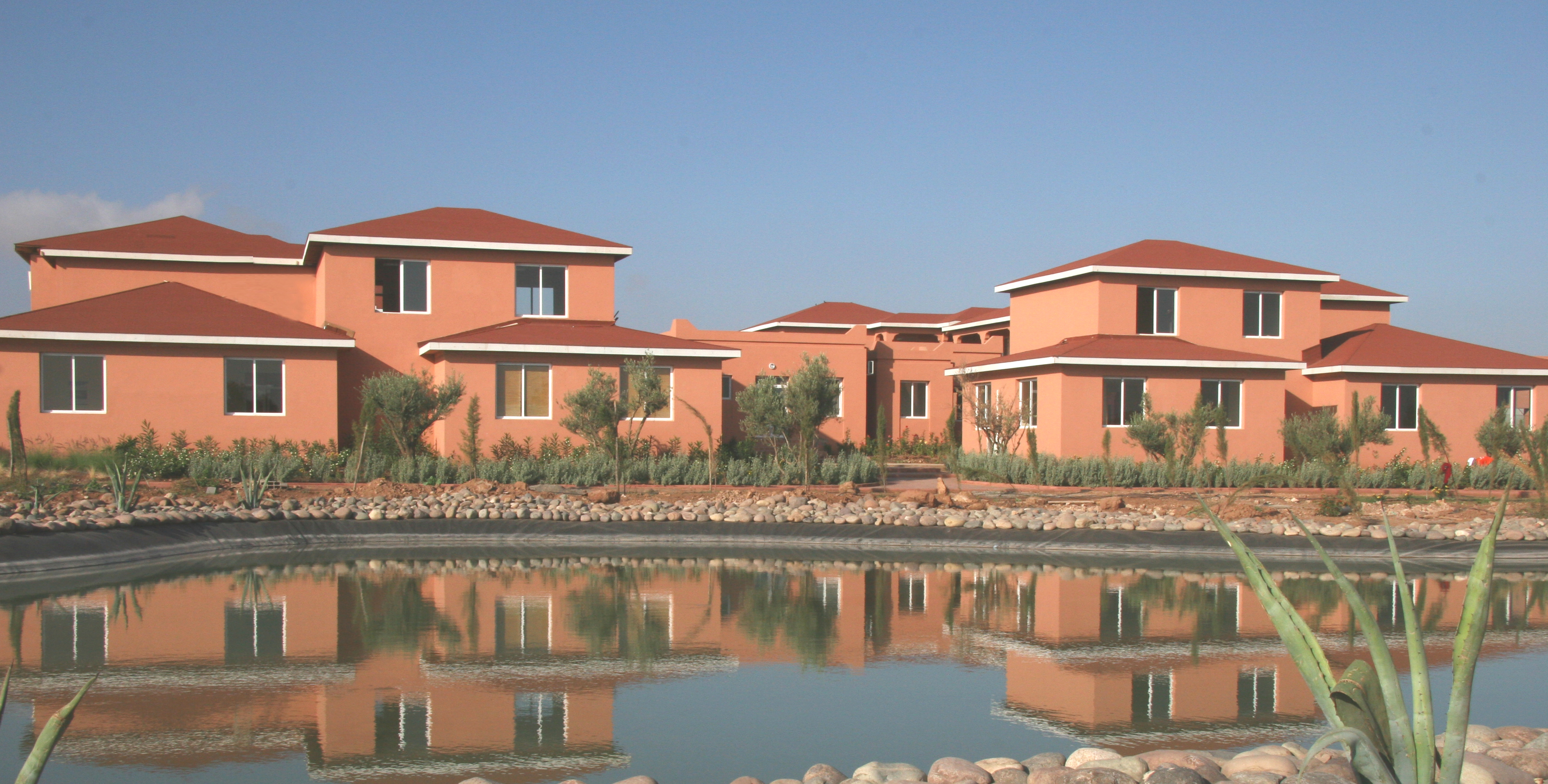
Private University of Marrakech

UPM has several campuses in Africa, including locations in Morocco and Senegal.

The Marrakesh campus, UPM's headquarters, spans 32 hectares and hosts over 3,000 students.

== See also ==
- List of universities in Morocco
