= Mohammed VI University of Health Sciences =

University in Morocco

- Université Mohammed VI des Sciences et de la Santé جامعة محمد السادس لعلوم الصحة
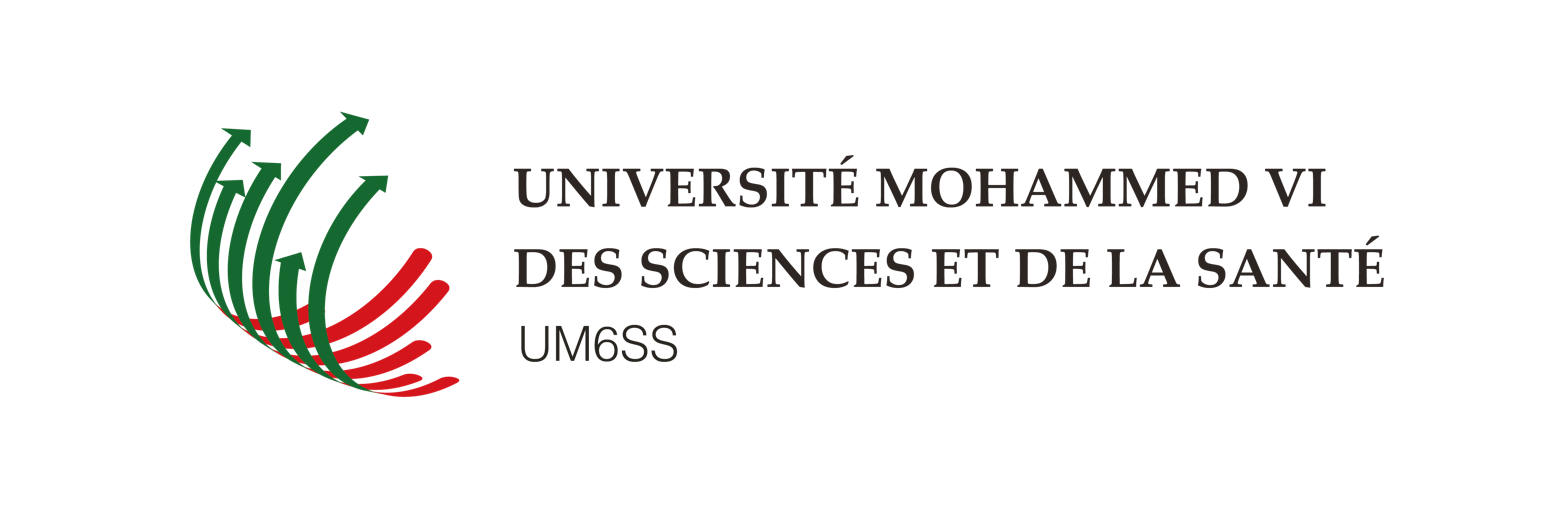
- Type: Semi-public, non-profit university
- Established: 2014; 12 years ago
- Affiliations: AUF
- President: Mohamed Adnaoui
- Students: 8,140 (2024–2025)
- Location: Morocco
- Website: um6ss.ma

Mohammed VI University of Health Sciences (UM6SS; French: Université Mohammed VI des Sciences et de la Santé) is a non-profit university in Morocco, established in 2014 by the Mohammed VI Foundation for Health Sciences (FM6SS). It offers undergraduate and postgraduate programs in health-related fields and conducts research in Health sciences.

== History ==
UM6SS was established in 2014 by the Mohammed VI Foundation for Health Sciences as a semi-public, non-profit institution headquartered in Casablanca, Morocco. The university was founded with a focus on training and research in health-related fields, organized into several faculties and specialized schools.

Over the years, the university has expanded its locations, establishing campuses in Rabat and Dakhla in addition to new sites in Casablanca. Campuses in Agadir and Marrakesh were announced for the 2025–2026 academic year.

== Campus ==
The Casablanca campus consists of sites located in Anfa City, the Ligue Arabe district, and Bouskoura.

In Rabat, the Madinat Al Irfane campus hosts programs in medicine, veterinary medicine, and other health sciences. Rabat also houses the new Mohammed VI International University Hospital. Dakhla offers similar programs in health sciences, and campuses have also been established in Agadir and Marrakesh.

== Academics and mission ==
UM6SS offers programs in medicine, pharmacy, dentistry, nursing sciences, biomedical engineering, public health, and other health-related fields. These are delivered through several schools and faculties, including the Faculty of Medicine, the Faculty of Pharmacy, the School of Engineering in Health Sciences, and the International School of Public Health.

The university's mission includes education, scientific research, and contributing to the improvement of healthcare practices in Morocco and the wider region.

== Partnerships ==
=== National partnerships ===
In Morocco, UM6SS collaborates with public and private partners, including the Ministry of Health and Social Protection, the Ministry of Higher Education, Scientific Research and Innovation, and various university hospitals. It also has agreements with the National Social Security Fund, Saham Foundation, Crédit Agricole, and Al Barid Bank.

=== International partnerships ===
UM6SS maintains academic and medical collaborations with:

- Harvard Medical Faculty Physicians (United States)
- University of Paris Cité (France)
- University of Franche-Comté (France)
- University of Montreal (Canada)
- Montpellier University Hospital (France)
- Catholic University of Lille (France)
- University of Illinois Chicago (United States)
- Aristide Le Dantec Hospital (Senegal)
- Institut Pasteur d'Abidjan (Ivory Coast)

== See also ==
- Education in Morocco
- Healthcare in Morocco
