= École d'Architecture de Casablanca =

Ecole d'Architecture de Casablanca
- École d'Architecture de Casablanca
- Type: School of Architecture and Landscape
- Established: 2004
- Founders: Mr. Benabeljalil and Mr. Lahbabi
- Affiliation: Private institution
- Campus: Roudani Campus
- Website: Official website

The Ecole d'Architecture de Casablanca (EAC) is a private institution for professional education located in Casablanca, Morocco.

== History ==
The school was established in 2004 under a public-private partnership initiated by the Moroccan government. The founders and leaders of the school were Mr. Benabeljalil and Mr. Lahbabi. In October 2018, it was announced that the school joined the Honoris United Universities network, becoming the third Moroccan institution in the group, alongside Université Mundiapolis and the EMSI.

=== Programs ===
The school offers degrees in architecture and landscape architecture. Graduates are eligible to register with the Moroccan National Order of Architects. Classes are held at the 10,000m² campus shared with EMSI and Mundiapolis in Casablanca, inaugurated in 2019.

Scholarships are available for studying at partner universities, including EAC Paris.

== See also ==
- List of architecture schools
- Honoris United Universities
- EMSI
- Université Mundiapolis
