= École Centrale Casablanca =

Coordinates: 33.4802°N 7.6201°W

- Motto: Inventons le monde de demain
- Type: Grande École d'ingénieurs
- Established: 2013
- Founders: Ministry of Industry and Commerce, Centrale Paris
- Director: Jalal CHARAF
- Location: Casablanca, Morocco
- Campus: Ville Verte Côté Latéral Est – Bouskoura
- Language: French
- Website: centrale-casablanca.ma

École Centrale Casablanca (in Arabic: المدرسة المركزية للدار البيضاء), commonly referred to as ECC, is a public engineering school and part of the French group of Écoles Centrales. It is the first generalist engineering school in Morocco and primarily known for training engineers who receive the title "Generalist Centralien Engineer" (in Arabic: مهندس مركزي عام).

The school is located on the Bouskoura campus, south of Casablanca. Its engineering degree is also recognized by the French government through its accreditation by the Commission des titres d'ingénieur (CTI) in 2017.

Centrale Casablanca is also recognized at the European level thanks to the EUR-ACE Label, Master's degree, in line with the international quality standards in the specific field of engineering education.

== History ==
Centrale Casablanca was established to promote the industrialization of Morocco. This initiative is part of the "National Pact for Industrial Emergence," aimed at training Moroccan leaders with strong scientific and technical skills, as well as the soft skills and leadership necessary to manage major projects in the kingdom and meet future challenges.

The idea of establishing a Centrale school in Morocco was proposed by Moroccan graduates of Centrale Paris, including the former Moroccan Minister of Industry, Ahmed Reda Chami, who was in charge of the "National Pact for Industrial Emergence" from 2009 to 2015.

- April 3, 2013: The convention for the creation of Centrale Casablanca was signed between Centrale Paris and the French Ministry of Higher Education and Research, and the Moroccan state represented by the Ministry of Economy and Finance, the Ministry of Higher Education, and the Ministry of Industry and Commerce. The signing took place at the royal palace in Casablanca in the presence of King Mohammed VI, French President François Hollande, and Hervé Biausser, Director of Centrale Paris. Centrale Casablanca was thus founded based on a convention signed at the highest level. This partnership gives it the status of a Moroccan public school.
- 2014: The Fondation École Centrale Casablanca, a non-profit organization, was created to manage Centrale Casablanca. It is led by a board of directors chaired by the Moroccan Minister of Industry and Commerce and CentraleSupélec, which also governs the school.
- October 27, 2014: Ghita Lahlou, a Centralienne and Moroccan businesswoman, was appointed General Director of Centrale Casablanca.
- September 2015: Centrale Casablanca welcomed its first class of engineering students, who graduated in September 2018.

== Education ==
École Centrale Casablanca is a school of sciences and engineering. It trains generalist engineers mainly around five fields:

- Mathematics & Computer Science
- Physics
- Economics
- Mechanics
- Human and Social Sciences

=== Recruitment ===
Candidates to Centrale Casablanca come from several streams:

- Through a national competitive examination system (CNC) in collaboration with Morocco’s network of preparatory classes.
- Through the admission exam, Centrale Casablanca, modeled on that of the French Groupe des Écoles centrales.
- Through parallel admissions, after a bachelor's degree (or equivalent) or a preparatory cycle for the French Grandes Écoles.
