= Sheikh Zayed Foundation =

Non-profit organization in Rabat, Morocco

Sheikh Zayed Foundation, is a non-profit organization that was created in Rabat. It focuses on the health sector. The foundation aims at contributing to the Moroccan university-hospital sphere as well as ensuring quality social services oriented towards future health practitioners. It is named after Sheikh Zayed bin Sultan Al Nahyan, Emir of Abu Dhabi, and the founder and first president of the United Arab Emirates.

The activities of the foundation are represented by four essential components: Medical care, teaching, research and medical support for populations in difficulty. These components strengthen the health sector in Morocco and actively contribute to the improvement of treatments, hospital infrastructure and medical equipment.

== History ==
The Sheikh Zayed Foundation was established in Rabat by Department of Community Development in Abu Dhabi which also established Ma'an, Dar Zayed and ZHO.The vision of the foundation is based on the principles of excellence, solidarity and respect for differences.

Since 2003, the foundation put in place a development program that focused on launching new medical, education and training institutions. This new strategy aims to gradually strengthen the presence of its components throughout Morocco.

In 2016, the foundation announces the launching of a genetic research center in partnership with UIASS and the institute of Genetic Diseases "Imagine" of Paris.

The foundation is made up of five healthcare facilities, one university campus with a training capacity in the form of three faculties and two institutes of higher education, three research centers, one center of bioequivalence studies, and several mobile care units. The Sheikh Zayed foundation organized the first African Health Forum that took place in May 2015. The forum focused on the theme of HIV, with the presence of the medicine Nobel prize winner Françoise Barré-Sinoussi.

== Foundation’s governance ==
In 2003, the King Mohammed VI appointed Mounir Majidi as the president of the Sheikh Zayed foundation. Mounir Majidi implemented a new economic model for the foundation to regain balance and financial autonomy. From 2003 to 2016, the foundation's turnover went from 2.9 million euros to 58.2 million euros, with an average annual growth of 26%. The foundation yields 5.5 million euros per year, a net result fully reinvested in infrastructural development.
