= Private University of Fes =

Coordinates: 34.0070°N 5.0165°W

- الجامعة الخاصة لفاس
- Type: Private university
- Established: 2006 (as École polytechnique des nouvelles technologies - Technologia)
- President: Mohammed Aziz LAHLOU
- Location: Fes, Morocco, Morocco
- Language: English, Arabic, French
- Website: Official website

The Private University of Fes (الجامعة الخاصة لفاس) is a private institution of higher education recognized by the state located in Fes, Morocco.

== History ==
Founded by the Maghreb Society for Management and Training (SOMAGEF) in 2006 under the name "École polytechnique des nouvelles technologies - Technologia", UPF became a private university in December 2013. It is the first private campus in Fes.

== Schools and programs ==
The university consists of a faculty, an institute, and two schools:

=== Faculty of Engineering Sciences ===
- Civil Engineering
- Electronic Engineering, Automation and Control
- Renewable Energies and Energy Systems
- Computer Engineering

=== Institute of Advanced Legal and Social Studies ===
- Notarial Law and Business Law

=== Fes Business School ===
- Accounting, Control and Audit
- Human Resources Management
- International Business
- Marketing and Communication
- Finance and Banking
- Logistics and Transportation
- Economic and Commercial Preparation

=== Higher School of Architecture and Building Trades ===
- Interior Architecture and Design
- Landscape Architecture
- Urban Planning and Development
