= International University of Rabat =

University in Morocco

- Université Internationale de Rabat الجامعة الدولية للرباط
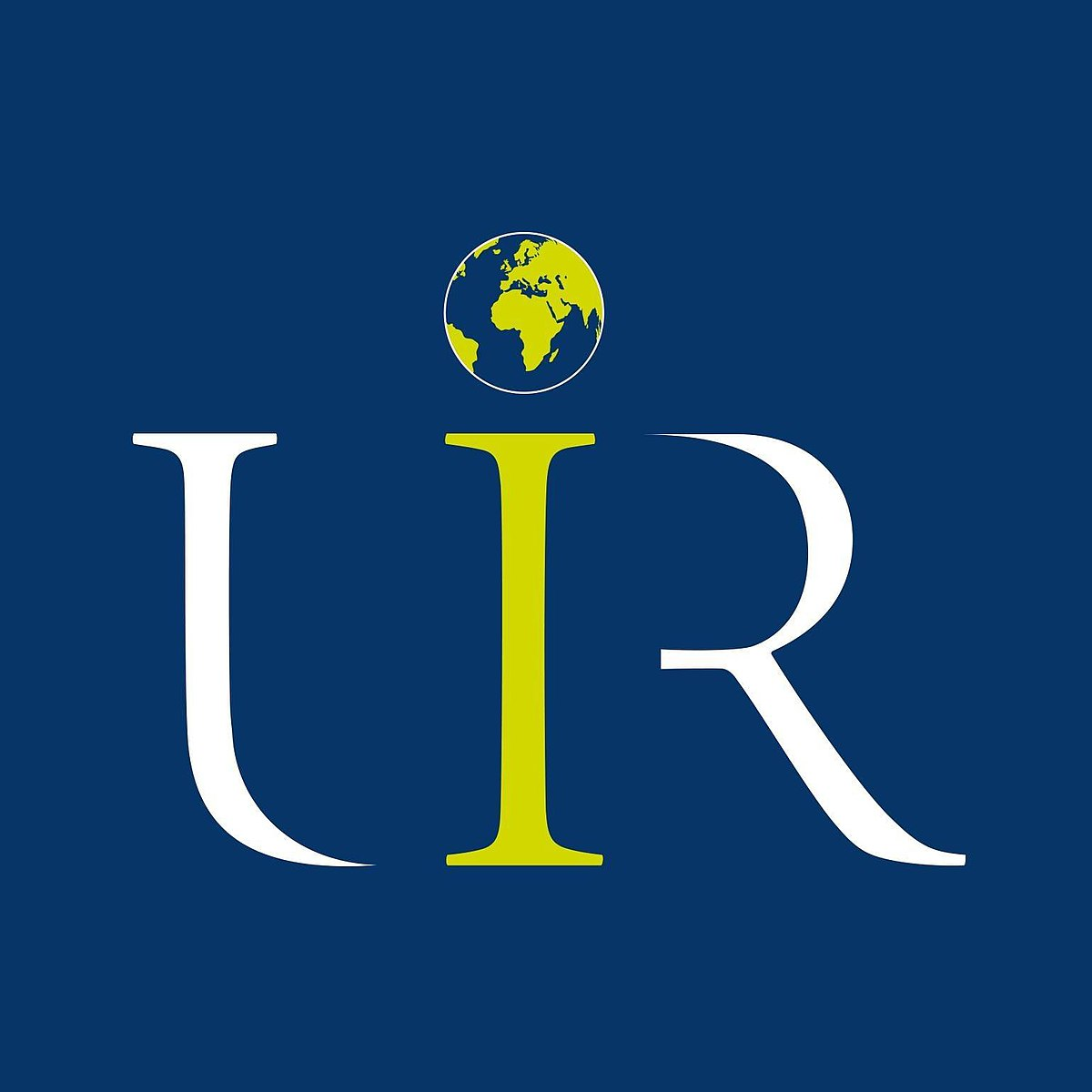
- Motto: L'université innovante
- Motto in English: "The innovative university"
- Type: Semi-public university
- Established: 2010; 16 years ago
- President: Noureddine Mouaddib
- Vice-president: Ahmed Ezbakhe; Mohamed Abdellaoui; Abdelaziz Benjouad
- Students: 8,000
- Location: Salé, Rabat-Salé-Kénitra, Morocco; 33°59′07″N 6°43′25″W
- Campus: Suburban
- Colours: Blue and white
- Website: uir.ac.ma

The International University of Rabat (UIR; French: Université Internationale de Rabat) is a semi-public university located in Salé, within the Rabat-Salé-Kénitra region of Morocco. It was established in 2010 as the first higher education institution in the country founded through a public–private partnership.

The university offers a range of undergraduate and postgraduate programs, many of which are organized as double degrees in cooperation with international partner institutions. Fields of study include law, engineering, aeronautics, energy engineering, architecture, business management, political science, and health sciences.

It is recognized for its contribution to the diversification of Moroccan higher education, particularly through its emphasis on international collaboration and applied research.

== History ==
The International University of Rabat was first conceived in 2005 by Noureddine Mouaddib, a Moroccan computer scientist and academic. His goal was to establish an institution that could combine national support with international expertise, while drawing on the skills of the Moroccan academic diaspora.

In 2007 the project received support from the governments of Morocco and France, which encouraged the creation of a higher education model based on a public–private partnership.

In 2009 the initiative was approved by the Moroccan Ministry of Higher Education. The Caisse de dépôt et de gestion (CDG), a major public financial institution in Morocco, became a principal investor. A plot of land was allocated in the Technopolis area of Salé, and in September 2010 King Mohammed VI presided over the laying of the foundation stone. Teaching and research activities began later the same year.

Initial academic programs focused on business studies, information technology, preparatory classes for engineering, and executive education. Over the following years the university expanded its offerings to include political science, aerospace engineering, energy engineering, actuarial science, and architecture. By the mid 2010s new schools in dental medicine and automotive engineering were also introduced, and the institution received formal recognition from the Moroccan state.

In 2017 the university partnered with the IHECS in Brussels to establish a program in communication and media. In 2020 the Rabat Business School, part of the university, obtained AACSB accreditation. In 2023 construction began on a university hospital and new facilities for medicine, paramedical sciences, and biomedical engineering. In 2024 the first programs in civil engineering were launched, and three of the university’s engineering schools obtained accreditation from the Commission des Titres d'Ingénieur and the EUR-ACE quality label.

== Academic Structure ==
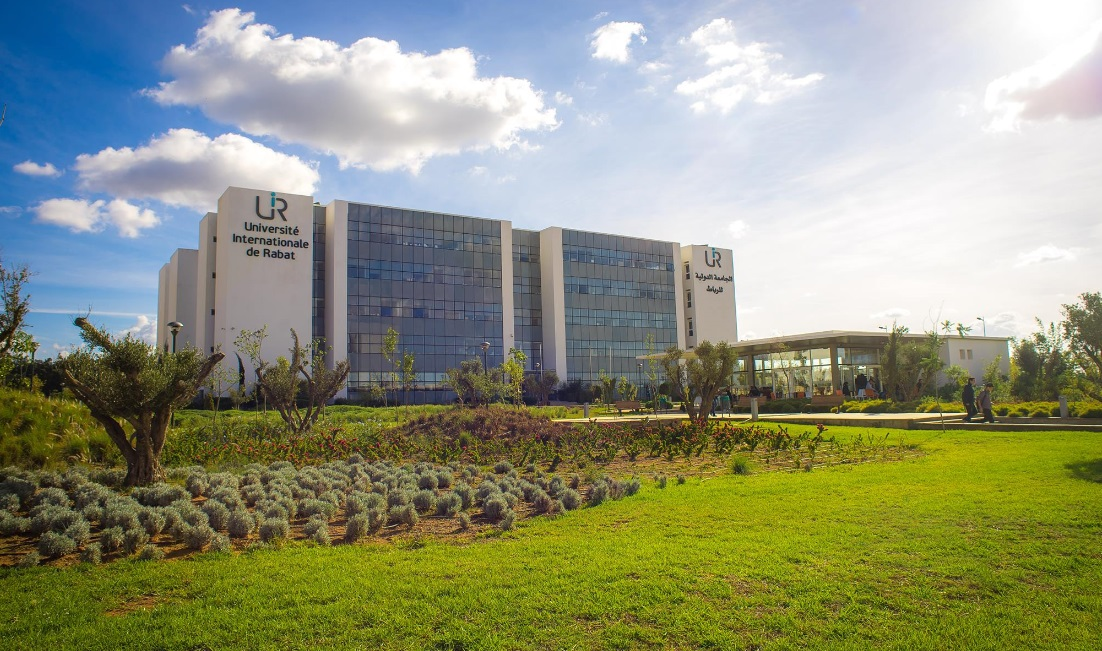
Teaching building n°1 - UIR campus

The International University of Rabat is organized into several colleges that group its principal schools and faculties:

=== College of Engineering and Architecture ===
- School of Automotive Engineering
- School of Aerospace Engineering
- Higher School of Energy Engineering (École Supérieure d'Ingénierie de l'Énergie)
- Faculty of Computer Science and Logistics (École supérieure d'informatique et du numérique)
- Rabat School of Architecture (École d'Architecture de Rabat)
- Civil Engineering (École de génie civil)

=== College of Social Sciences ===
- School of Political Science (Sciences Po Rabat)
- Law School (École de Droit)
- Communication and Media unit (IHECS Afrique, Communication & Médias)
- School of Languages, Cultures and Civilizations (Langues, Cultures et Civilisations)

=== College of Health Sciences ===
- Faculty of Medicine (Faculté internationale de médecine)
- Faculty of Dental Medicine (Faculté internationale de médecine dentaire)
- Higher School of Paramedical Sciences (École supérieure de sciences paramédicales)
- Biomedical Engineering School (École d'ingénierie biomédicale, under development)
- University Hospital (Hôpital universitaire international de Rabat, under construction)

=== College of Management ===
- Rabat Business School

=== College of Doctoral Studies ===
- Doctoral programs in Humanities, Technical Sciences, Engineering, Life Sciences and Management

== Campus ==
The International University of Rabat campus includes a number of facilities designed for academic and student life. A central library is available to students and staff, and the campus also contains a university restaurant and a swimming pool.

Recreational facilities include playing fields for soccer, volleyball, tennis, and basketball, along with areas for table tennis. The university maintains six residential halls that provide accommodation for students.

== Funding ==
The initial investment in the International University of Rabat totaled 104 million dirhams. Of this amount, 57 million dirhams were provided by the Caisse de dépôt et de gestion (CDG), while the Moroccan state contributed 47 million dirhams in the form of 20 hectares of land designated for the construction of a residential campus.

Beginning with the 2014–2015 academic year, and in partnership with the CDG, the university created the "Tamwil UIR" fund to support students in financing their studies. The scheme allows for partial coverage of tuition fees through loans with a repayment period of up to twelve years, including a grace period equal to the duration of studies plus one additional year. Around 600 students have benefited from this arrangement.

== Research and development ==
The International University of Rabat carries out activities in research and development alongside its teaching mission. In 2014 the university received the International Quality Crown award in recognition of its work in research and innovation.

On 27 May 2014 the institution was awarded the first National Innovation Prize by the Prime Minister of Morocco. The prize was organized by the Moroccan Office of Industrial and Commercial Property (OMPIC) and highlighted the university’s role in applied research and technology transfer.

Since its inception, the UIR registered patents related to renewable energy and road safety. These patents are being used for the production of :

- Solar thermal collector dish
- Solar lamp
- LED crosswalk
- Braking detector and GPS/radio warning
- Smart road signs tracking
- Domestic wind turbine

== See also ==
- List of universities in Morocco
- Education in Morocco
