= National School of Architecture =

Public architectural school in Rabat, Morocco

- المدرسة الوطنية للهندسة المعمارية
- Type: Public
- Established: 1980; 46 years ago
- Students: 230
- Location: Morocco; 33.986569°N 6.861202°W
- Language: French, English
- Website: www.archi.ac.ma

The National School of Architecture (ENA) (Arabic: المدرسة الوطنية للهندسة المعمارية) is a Moroccan public higher education institution specializing in the training of architects. Placed under the supervision of the ministry responsible for housing and urban planning, it is one of the main institutions for architectural education in Morocco.

The institution operates a network of schools located in several cities, including Rabat, Fes, Marrakesh, Tetouan, Agadir and Oujda. Its main campus is located in Al Irfane, in the Agdal-Ryad district of Rabat.

== Overview ==
The National School of Architecture (ENA) is a public higher education institution specializing in architectural education in Morocco. It operates under the supervision of the ministry responsible for housing and urban planning. Established in 1980 in Rabat, the institution has trained more than 1,700 architects.

Since its establishment, student enrollment has increased significantly. In response to growing national demand for architects, ENA has expanded its presence through the creation of additional campuses. Branches were established in Fes and Tetouan in 2009, followed by Marrakesh in 2011 and Agadir in 2016.

ENA’s functions include teaching, research, the dissemination of architectural knowledge, and the conduct of studies for public administrations. It also awards academic degrees in architecture, including the doctorate and the Advanced Studies Diploma (DESA).

The main campus is located within the Madinat Al Irfane university complex in Rabat, covering an area of approximately 1.6 hectares, with built facilities totaling around 20,000 m^{2}.

== Academic program ==
The ENA curriculum spans 12 semesters and includes both mandatory and elective courses organized into modular units. The program covers several disciplinary areas, including:

- theory and practice of architectural design;
- urban planning and urban studies;
- representation and visual expression;
- scientific and technical disciplines;
- human and social sciences;
- language instruction.

== Continuing education ==
ENA provides continuing education programs aimed at updating and enhancing the skills of practicing architects in response to technological, regulatory, economic, and social developments affecting the profession.

In 2010, the institution introduced a university diploma in urban renewal and urban policy in Morocco, in partnership with the University of Paris-Est Marne-la-Vallée.

== Postgraduate programs ==
ENA offers several postgraduate and specialized programs:

- a doctoral program and a Diploma of Advanced Studies in Architecture (DESA) within the research unit “Habitat, Architecture, and Urbanization of Territories”; the DESA program has a duration of two years;
- a master's degree in architecture, landscape and territorial planning, developed in partnership with the Mediterranea University of Reggio Calabria in Italy, the School of Architecture of Barcelona, and the Hassan II Institute of Agronomy and Veterinary Medicine in Rabat;
- a higher diploma in architecture and heritage professions, established in cooperation with the Centre for Advanced Studies of Chaillot.

== Educational and research facilities ==
ENA has teaching and research infrastructure supporting its academic activities, including a specialized documentation center covering fields such as architecture, art, design, landscape, urban planning, environment, territorial planning, housing, cultural heritage, and construction.

Its facilities include:

- approximately 10,000 books and 2,500 audiovisual documents (slides, microfiches);
- several didactic laboratories, including materials and structures, design, and audiovisual laboratories;
- a computer center;
- research structures, including the laboratory “Habitat, Architecture, and Urbanization of Territories” (LabHaut), a laboratory dedicated to earthen architecture, and a laboratory focusing on heritage and heritage professions.

== ENA of Fes ==
On 14 January 2009, a partnership agreement was signed in Fes for the establishment of a branch of the National School of Architecture. The agreement involved ENA Rabat, represented by its director, the Municipality of Fes, and the Regional Council of the Order of Architects of Fes.

The premises of the branch, provided by the Municipality of Fes, are located within the Municipal Library of Fes. On 23 September 2009, the site began hosting its first cohort of 16 students, who had been admitted through ENA Rabat. Teaching activities commenced at the beginning of the 2009–2010 academic year.

The branch was officially inaugurated on 12 October 2009.

== Admission ==
=== Initial training ===
The initial training program in architecture has a duration of six years. Admission is open to holders of a scientific, technical, or economic baccalaureate, or an equivalent qualification. Candidates are typically required to be under the age of 22 and must pass a selection process based on academic records, followed by written and oral examinations.

=== Specialized master's programs ===
Specialized master's programs have a duration of four semesters. Admission is open to candidates holding a degree equivalent to at least three or four years of higher education (BAC+3 or BAC+4), subject to evaluation of the application dossier and an interview.
