= Al-Zahrawi International University of Health Sciences =

Moroccan university

Coordinates: 33°58′39″N 6°52′11″W

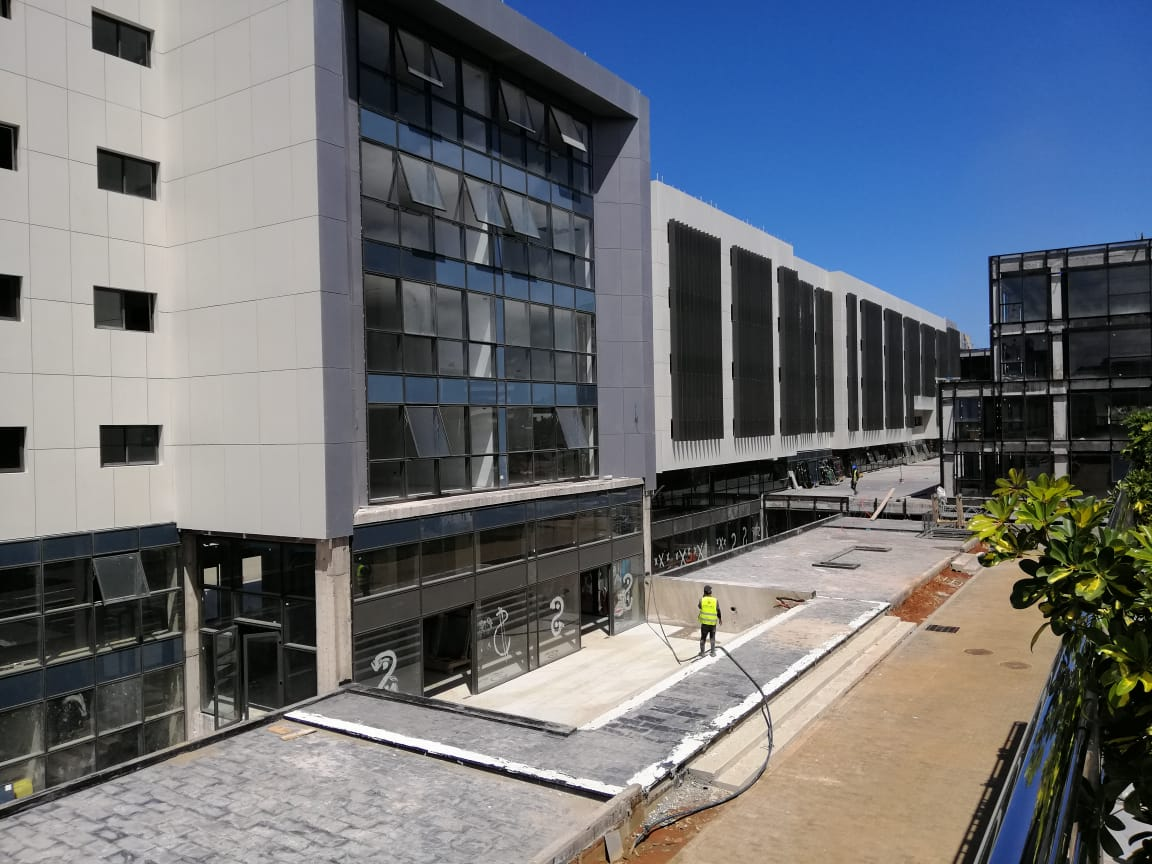
One of the campuses of UIASS

Al-Zahrawi International University of Health Sciences (UIASS) [2] is a Moroccan university that opened in June 2014.

Al-Zahrawi International University of Health Sciences was established in the framework of a public sector partnership with the Ministry of Higher Education, Scientific Research and Training, and consists of three institutions: Al-Zahrawi College of Medicine, Al-Zahrawi Faculty of Dentistry, Rabat Faculty of Health Sciences, and also the Higher Institute of Health Technologies and Engineering.

== Organization and structure ==
The UIASS is a university institution affiliated with the Sheikh Zayed Foundation in Rabat that has different components responsible for education, divided between faculties and institutes. These are four institutions:

- Al Zahrawi College of Medicine FMA
- Al Zahrawi College of Dentistry - FMDA
- Faculty of Pharmacy - FPA
- Higher Institute of Health Engineering and Technologies - ISITS
- Faculty of Health Sciences in Rabat - FSSR
- IFCP Institute of Paramedics

== Members of the Scientific Board ==
- President of the Scientific Board: Professor Françoise Barré-Sinoussi
