= National Institute of Posts and Telecommunications =

- المعهد الوطني للبريد و المواصلات
- Type: Grande école Public engineering school Member of the Conférence des grandes écoles
- Established: 1961
- Parent institution: Attached to the ANRT
- Director: TAMTAOUI Ahmed
- Academic staff: 90 (including 50 permanent)
- Students: 700
- Location: Rabat, Morocco; 33.980494°N 6.867959°W
- Affiliations: CGE
- Website: www.inpt.ac.ma
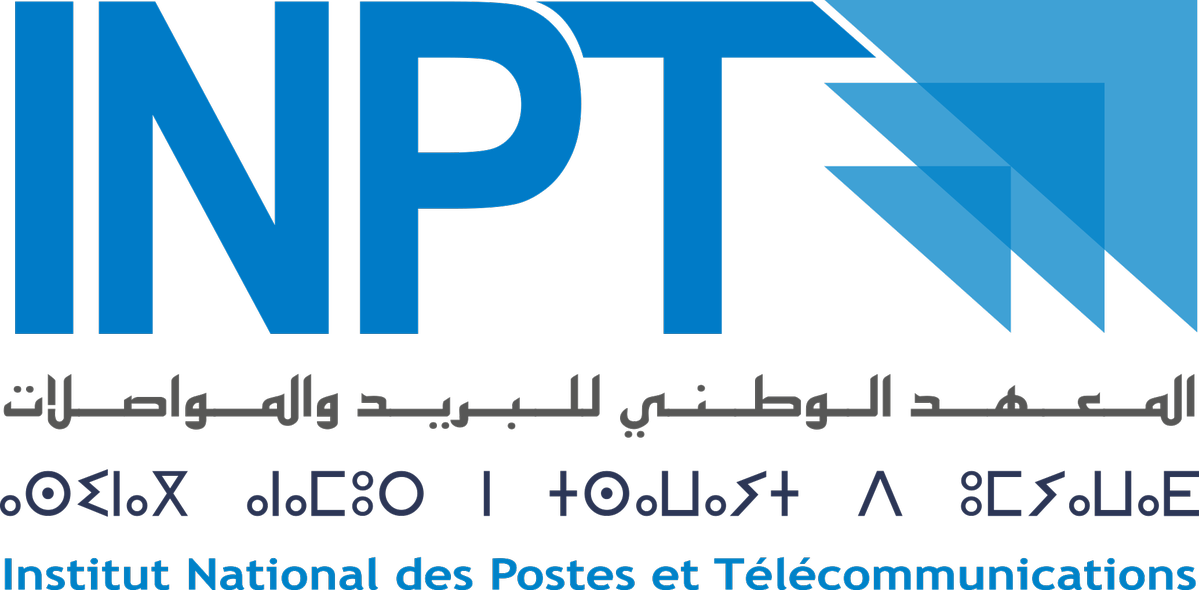

The National Institute of Posts and Telecommunications (INPT) (in Arabic: المعهد الوطني للبريد و المواصلات, in Amazigh: ⴰⵙⵉⵏⴰⴳ ⴰⵏⴰⵎⵓⵔ ⵏ ⵜⵙⴰⵡⴰⵢⵜ ⴷ ⵓⵎⵢⴰⵡⴰⴹ), located in Rabat, the administrative capital of Morocco, is one of the leading engineering schools in Morocco. It is affiliated with the ANRT and offers versatile training in the field of information and communication technologies. Since 2008, the institute has been a member of the Conférence des grandes écoles françaises (CGE), and is often referred to as Télécom Rabat, associating it with similar schools in France (Télécom Paris, Télécom Sud-Paris, Télécom Bretagne).

== Overview ==
The institute was established in 1961 to train middle management in the fields of post, telecommunications, and audiovisual media.

In 1979, it was established as a higher education institution and in 1991, due to the increased demand for resources in the ICT sector, it introduced an engineering cycle.

Statutorily, it was attached to the former ONPT in 1984. With the adoption of law 24-96, the school was attached to the Agence nationale de réglementation des télécommunications (ANRT).

Currently, it provides training in computer science and telecommunications.

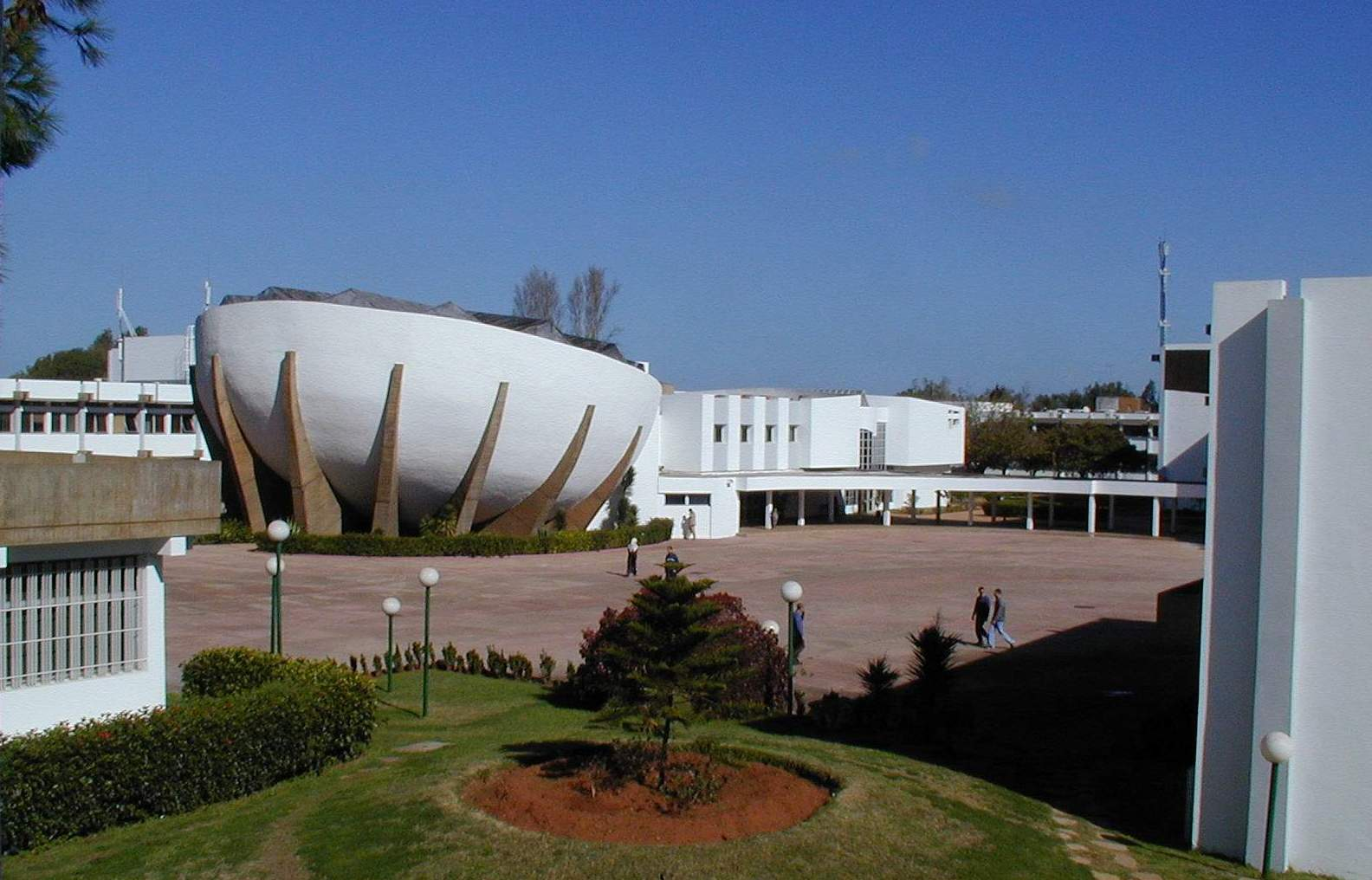
View of the grand amphitheater.

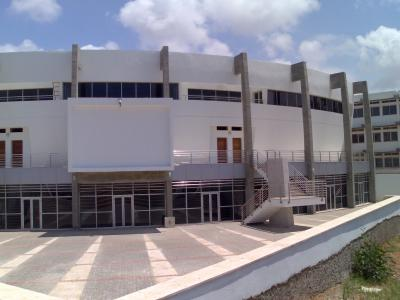
The new extension.

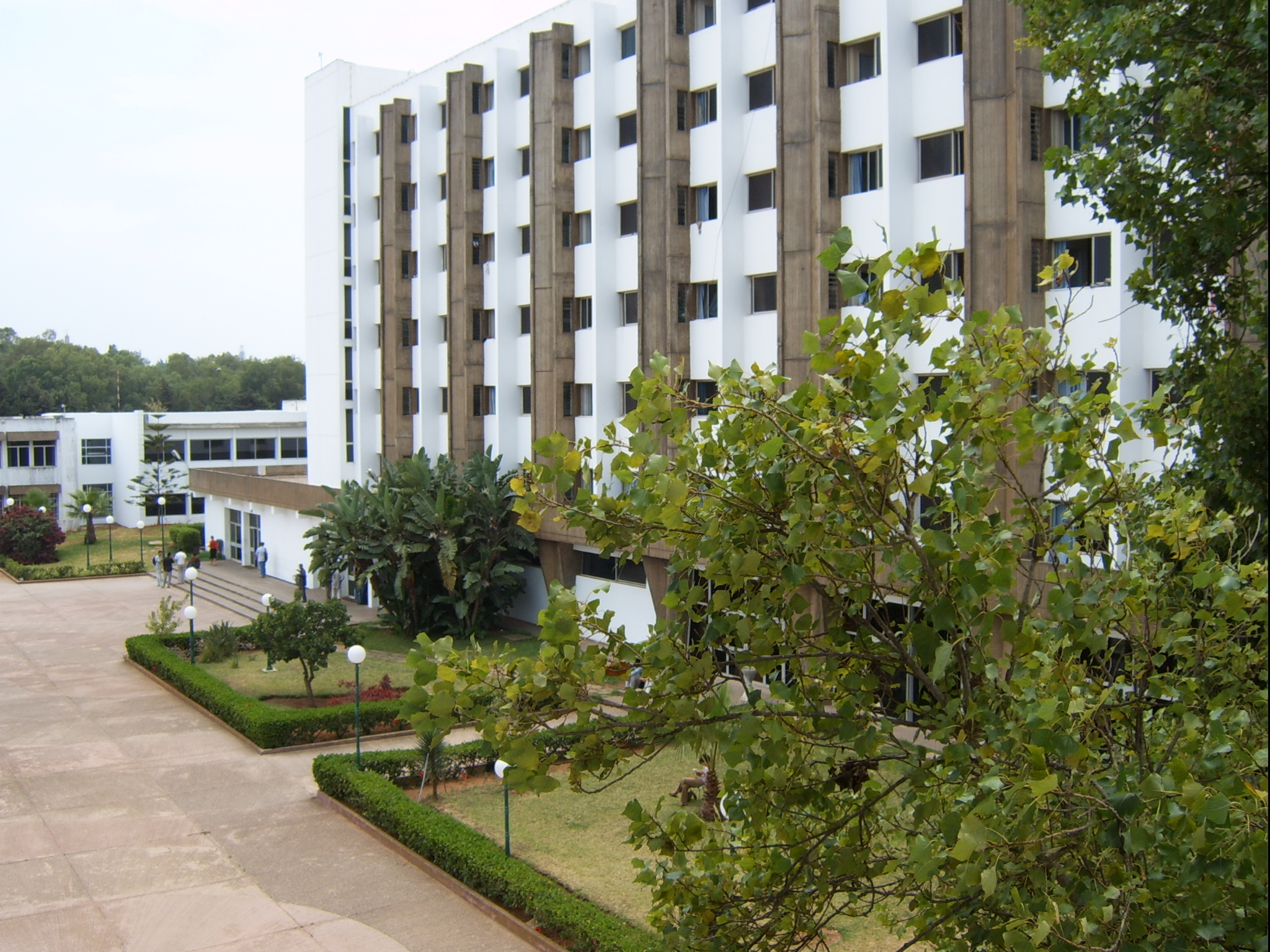
Student dormitory.

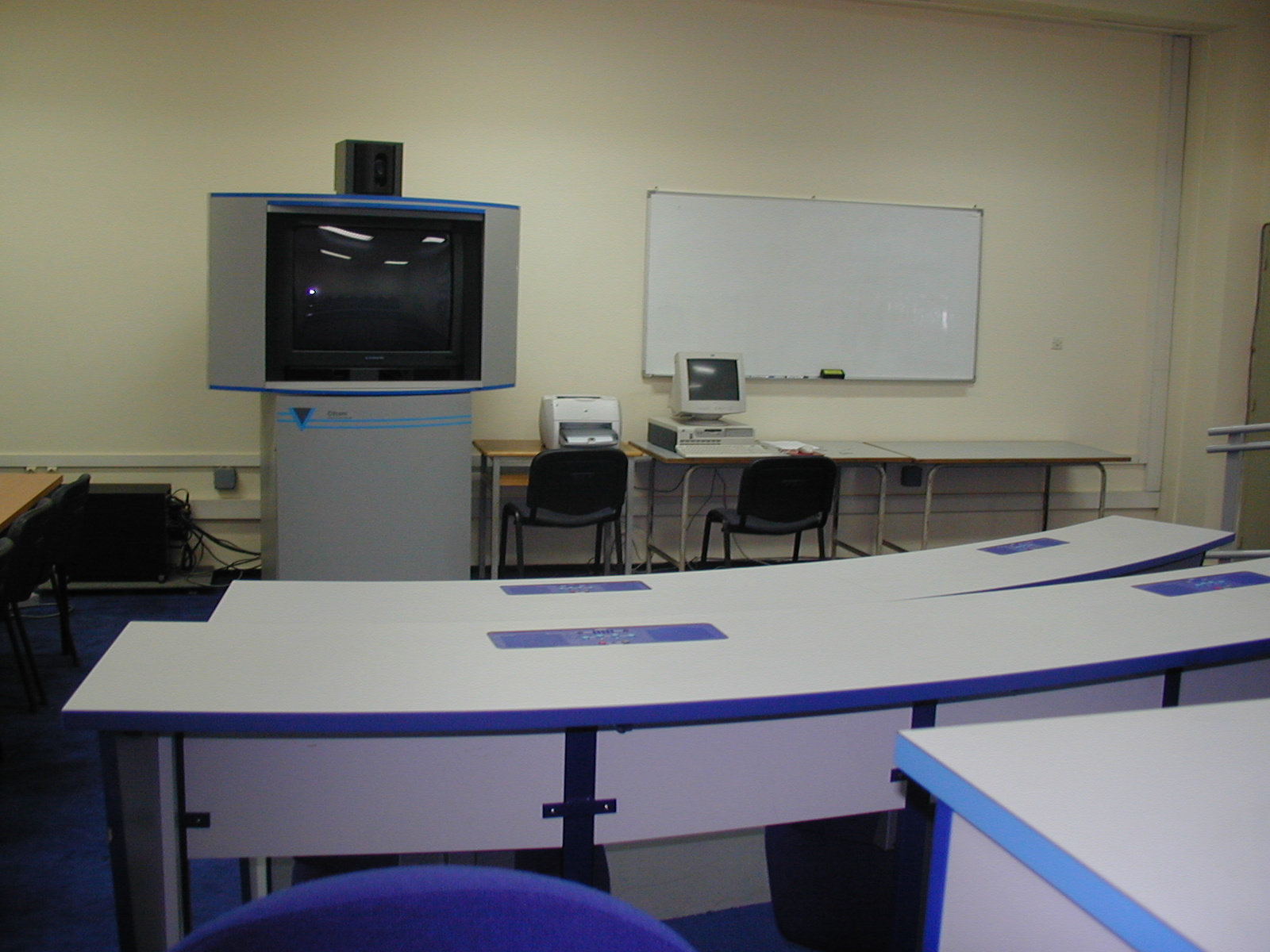
Videoconferencing room.

== Missions ==
INPT's primary mission is to train engineers and senior executives in the field of high information and communication technologies. To support the changes in the telecommunications sector, particularly its liberalization and opening to competition and private participation, and to provide the latter with highly qualified skills, it has implemented several actions focused on three main areas:

- a state engineering cycle that revolves around high-level scientific and technical training with the development of the student engineer's adaptability, initiative, and innovation capacities;
- a doctoral school since 2012;
- continuing education in line with the sector's needs.

To accomplish these missions, the institute relies on a permanent faculty of teacher-researchers and trainers, as well as a network of temporary staff from academia and industry professionals in the information technology sector. In this context, it also has a set of laboratories equipped with constantly updated didactic and professional equipment and a state-of-the-art computer network connecting its various laboratories and rooms.

== Training ==
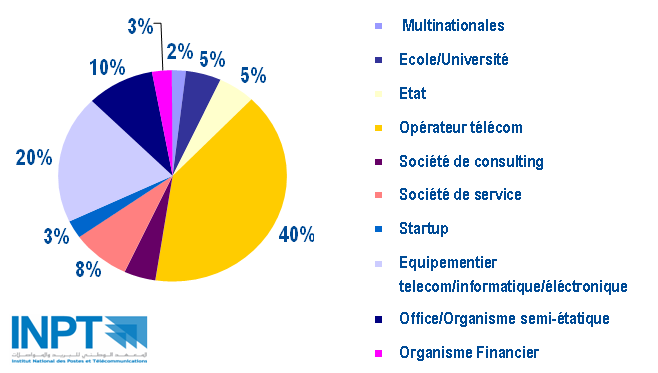
Distribution of graduates in 2003

The core activity of INPT is engineering training. The INPT has participated in the development of programs for new training institutions, both nationally and internationally.

As such, the number of engineering students has seen significant growth. It is expected to increase to 120 engineers per year over the next two years to reach 200 engineers per year starting in 2007.

Training programs evolve every year to align with the information and telecommunications technology sector, both technically, economically and legally. In this sense, in the third year, a new specialization in components for telecommunications systems was introduced in 2003, and two other specializations, one in enterprise telecommunications management and the other for project managers, were introduced in 2005. The teaching of economics and languages has been revised to match the realities of globalization (the TOEIC test has become mandatory since 2004).

As for the integration of INPT graduates, it occurs in various types of companies: national, international, public, and private.

According to a guide published by La Vie éco (LVE), the employment rate of institute graduates stands at 68% three months after graduation and 98% one year after graduation in 2016.

== Quality ==
Most of the national university programming competitions are marked by the strong presence of the institute's disciples (known as Inptists).

INPT is also well represented in international programming competitions, such as the Imagine Cup by Microsoft and the ACM in North Africa and Arab countries. It was also represented at the International Youth Congress, organized by Peace Child International, and the Moroccan Youth Forum, held in Casablanca in 2003.

In addition to the Horizons Telecoms association of institute graduates, engineering students have several clubs: AEINPT (student association), CIT (Computing and Telecommunications Club), and CESE (Electronics and Embedded Systems Club).

INPT has its Junior-Enterprise: A2S (Actions Services and Solutions). It is a non-profit association whose purpose is to create bridges between the professional world and the students of the school.

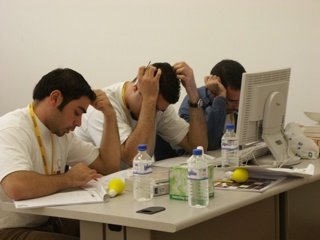
Participation in the ACM in Kuwait (ANARC region).

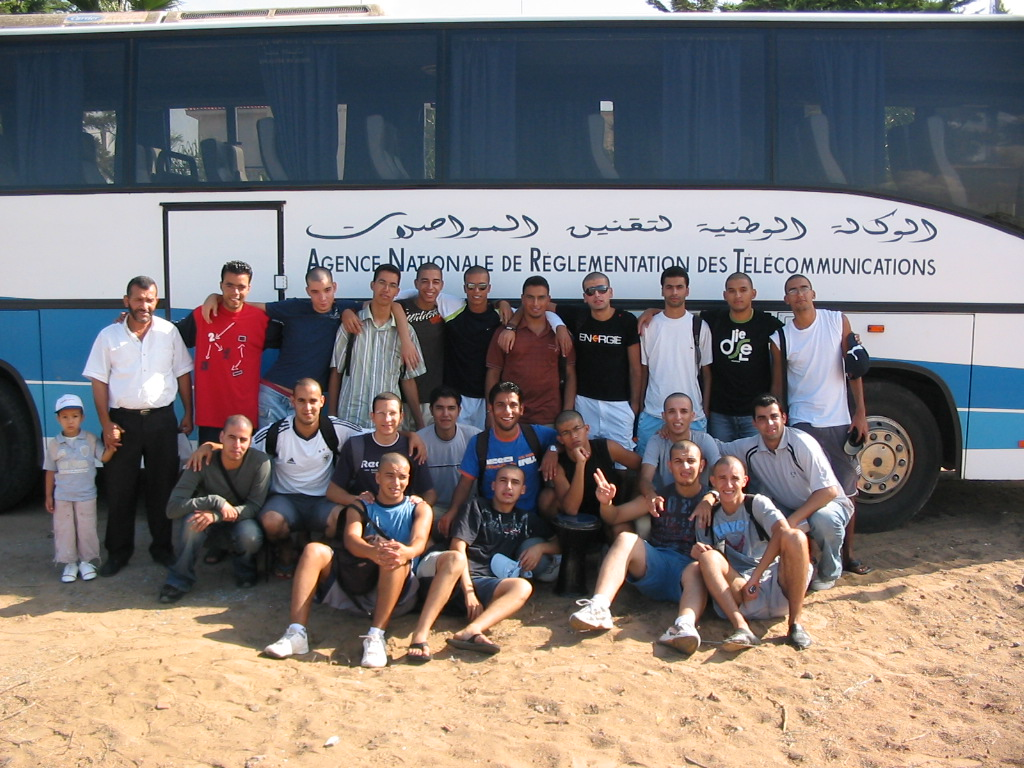
Excursion to Tangier.

During the 2009 graduation ceremony, the Director General of ANRT, Azzeddine El Mountassir Billah, specified that the agency is working to establish the Soft Centre, a software development center, which is scheduled to start in 2009 at INPT, before its final installation at the Casa Technopolis site. He also noted during the same ceremony that the 2009–2010 academic year would be labeled Quality and that INPT would undertake the necessary steps to be accredited by the French Commission des titres d'ingénieurs (CTI) to enhance its visibility at European and international levels.

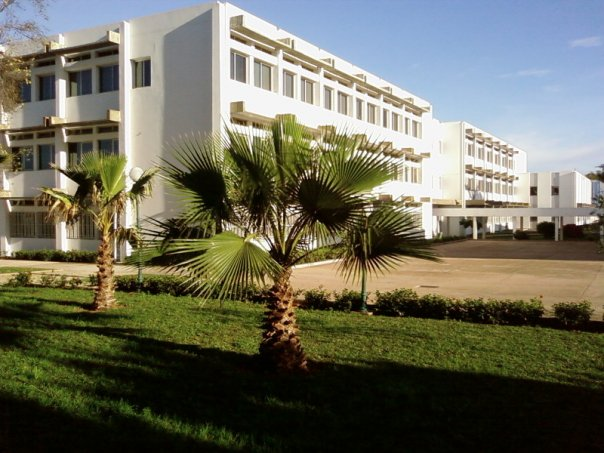
INPT laboratories.

== Notable alumni ==
- Younes Sekkouri, Minister of Economic Inclusion, Small Business, Employment, and Skills.
- Mohand Laenser, former Moroccan Minister of the Interior and former president of the Fès-Meknès regional council.
- Abdelaziz El Omari, former mayor of Casablanca.
