= HESTIM Engineering and Business School =

- Hautes études des sciences et techniques de l'ingénierie et du management
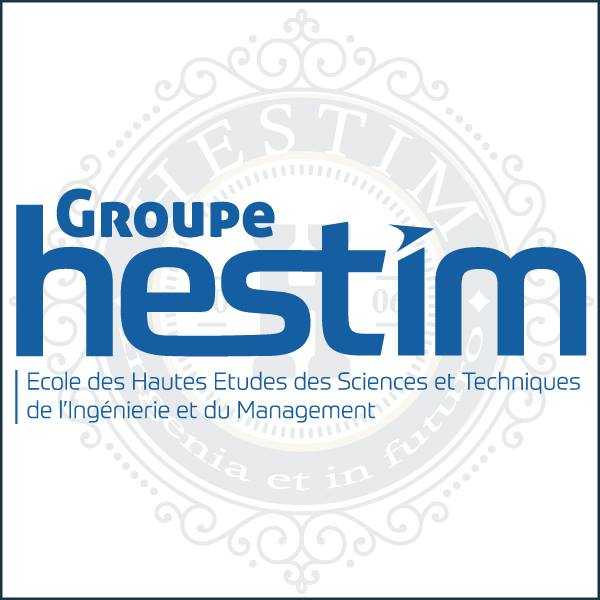
- Motto: Ingenia et in futuro
- Type: Private
- Established: 2006; 20 years ago
- President: Abdelilah Bennis
- Location: Casablanca, Morocco
- Website: hestim.ma

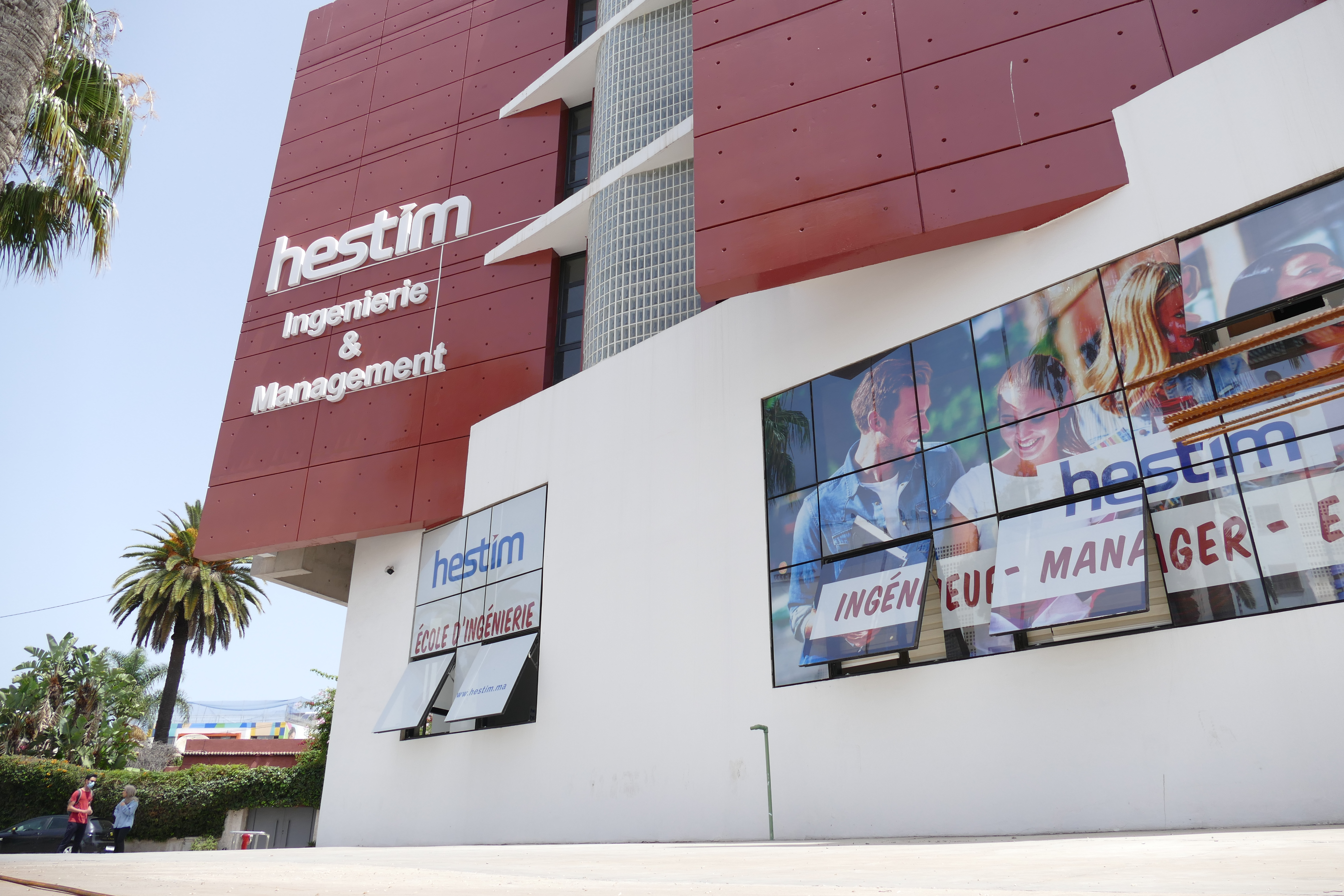
Exterior of HESTIM in Casablanca

HESTIM Engineering and Business School (HESTIM), (French: Hautes études des sciences et techniques de l'ingénierie et du management), is a Moroccan private higher education institution located in the city of Casablanca.

HESTIM offers its own Moroccan-accredited undergraduate degrees in industrial engineering, logistics engineering, civil engineering, and management.

It also offers French-accredited master's degrees in partnership with French universities and schools, such as UPHF (Université Polytechnique Hauts-de-France), ULCO (Université littoral côte d’opale), INSA Lyon (Institut National des sciences appliquées de Lyon), ESTIA (École supérieure des technologies industrielles avancées), IMT Lille Douai Ecole Mines de Douai.

== History ==
It was born in 2006 as a school of engineering offering degrees in industrial management. In 2008 it added civil engineering to its academic offer. In 2015-16 the original school was renamed HESTIM Engineering and a new school was created, HESTIM Management, offering degrees in business-related fields. Both independently accredited schools, HESTIM Engineering and HESTIM Management, constitute the HESTIM group.
