= List of medical schools in the Middle East =

The following is a list of medical schools in the Middle East.

== Bahrain ==
- Arabian Gulf University
- RCSI-Bahrain

== Egypt ==
- Ain Shams University El-Demerdash Faculty of Medicine
- Ain Shams National University Faculty of Medicine
- Al-Azhar University
  - Faculty of Medicine for Boys
  - Faculty of Medicine for Girls
  - Assiut Faculty of Medicine for Boys
  - Assiut Faculty of Medicine for Girls
  - Damietta Faculty of Medicine
- Alexandria University Faculty of Medicine
- Alexandria National University Faculty of Medicine
- Arab Academy for Science, Technology & Maritime Transport College of Medicine
- Arish University Faculty of Medicine
- Armed Forces College of Medicine
- Assiut University Faculty of Medicine
- Assiut National University Faculty of Medicine
- Aswan University Faculty of Medicine
- Badr University in Cairo School of Medicine
- Badya University School of Medicine
- Benha University College of Human Medicine
- Benha National University Factulty of Medicine
- Beni Suef University Faculty of Medicine
- Beni Suef National University Faculty of Medicine
- Cairo University Kasr Alainy School of Medicine
- Capital University Faculty of Medicine
- Damietta University Faculty of Medicine
- Delta University for Science and Technology Faculty of Medicine
- East Port Said National University Faculty of Medicine
- Fayoum University Faculty of Medicine
- Galala University Faculty of Medicine
- Horus University Faculty of Medicine
- Kafrelsheikh University Faculty of Medicine
- King Salman International University Faculty of Medicine
- Luxor University Faculty of Medicine
- Mansoura University Faculty of Medicine
- Mansoura National University Faculty of Medicine
- Memphis University School of Medicine
- Menoufia University Faculty of Medicine
- Menoufia National University Faculty of Medicine and Sugery
- Merit University Faculty of Medicine
- Minia University Faculty of Medicine
- Minia National University Faculty of Medicine
- Misr University for Science and Technology College of Medicine
- Modern University for Technology and Information Faculty of Medicine
- Nahda University in Beni Suef Faculty of Medicine
- Newgiza University School of Medicine
- New Ismailia National University Faculty of Medicine
- New Mansoura University Faculty of Medicine
- New Valley University Faculty of Medicine
- October 6 University Faculty of Medicine
- Port Said University Faculty of Medicine
- Sohag University Faculty of Medicine
- South Valley University Qena Faculty of Medicine
- South Valley National University Qena Faculty of Medicine
- Suez University Faculty of Medicine
- Suez Canal University Faculty of Medicine
- Tanta University Faculty of Medicine
- University of East Capital Faculty of Medicine
- Zagazig University
  - Faculty of Medicine
  - Faqous Faculty of Medicine
- Zagazig National University Faculty of Medicine

== Iran ==
- Ahvaz Jundishapur University of Medical Sciences
- Ali ebn Abitaleb Yazd Azad University of Medical Sciences
- Arak University of Medical Sciences
- Ardabil University of Medical Sciences
- Azad University of Medical Sciences
- Babol University of Medical Sciences, Babol
- Baqiyatallah Medical Sciences University, Tehran
- Birjand University of Medical Sciences
- Bushehr University of Medical Sciences, Bushehr
- Dezful University of Medical Sciences
- Fasa Faculty of Medical Sciences, Fasa
- Fatemiye University of Medical Sciences, Qom
- Golestan University of Medical Sciences, Gorgan
- Gonabad University of Medical Sciences, Gonabad
- Gorgan University of Medical Sciences
- Guilan University of Medical Sciences, Rasht
- Hamedan University of Medical Sciences, Hamedan
- Hormozgan University of Medical Sciences, Bandar Abbas
- Isfahan University of Medical Sciences, Isfahan
- Medical University of Ilam
- Iran University of Medical Sciences
- Islamic Azad University Tehran Medical Branch
- Islamic Azad University of Arak
- Jahrom University of Medical Sciences, Jahrom
- Kashan University of Medical Sciences, Kashan
- Kerman University of Medical Sciences, Kerman
- Kermanshah University of Medical Sciences, Kermanshah
- Kordestan University of Medical Sciences, Sanandaj
- Lorestan University of Medical Sciences, Khorramabad
- Mashhad University of Medical Sciences
- Mazandaran University of Medical Sciences, Sari
- Medical University of Ilam, Ilam
- Qazvin University of Medical Sciences, Qazvin
- Qom University of Medical Sciences, Qom
- Rafsanjan University of Medical Sciences, Rafsanjan
- Sabzevar School of Medical Sciences, Sabzevar
- Semnan University of Medical Sciences, Semnan
- Shahed University of Medical Sciences, Tehran
- Shahid Beheshti University of Medical Sciences
- Shahid Sadoughi University of Medical Sciences and Health Services
- Shahrekord University of Medical Sciences
- Shahroud University of Medical Sciences
- Shiraz University of Medical Sciences
- Tabriz University of Medical Sciences
- Tehran University of Medical Sciences
- Urmia University of Medical Sciences, Urmia (Oromieh)
- Yasuj University of Medical Sciences, Yasuj
- Yazd University of Medical Sciences
- Zahedan University of Medical Sciences, Zahedan
- Zanjn University of Medical Sciences, Zanjan
- Zabol University of Medical Science

== Iraq ==
- University of Anbar / College of Medicine, Al Anbar Governorate, Iraq
- University of Babylon / College of Medicine, Babil Governorate, Iraq
- University of Baghdad / College of Medicine, Baghdad, Iraq
- University of Baghdad / Al-Kindy College of Medicine, Baghdad, Iraq
- University of Basrah / College of Medicine, Basra, Iraq
- University of Diyala/ college of Medicine/Diyala
- University of Duhok / College of Medicine, Dahuk Governorate, Iraq
- Hawler Medical University / College of Medicine, Erbil
- University of Kirkuk / Kirkuk College of Medicine, Kirkuk, Iraq
- University of Kerbala / College of Medicine, Kerbala, Iraq
- University of Koya / School of Medicine, Erbil Governorate, Iraq
- University of Kufa / College of Medicine, Najaf, Iraq
- Al-Iraqia University / college of Medicine, Baghdad, Iraq
- University of Mosul / College of Medicine, Nineveh Governorate, Iraq
- University of Mosul / Ninevah College of Medicine Nineveh Governorate, Iraq
- Al-Mustansiriya University / College of Medicine, Baghdad, Iraq
- Al-Nahrain University / College of Medicine, Baghdad, Iraq
- University of Al-Qadisiyah / College of Medicine, Diwania, Iraq
- University of Sulaimani / College of Medicine, Sulaimaniyah Governorate, Iraq
- University of Thi-Qar / College of Medicine, Thi-Qar / Iraq
- Tikrit University College of Medicine (TUCOM), Saladin Governorate, Iraq
- University of Wasit / College of Medicine, Wasit Governorate, Iraq
- University of Zakho / College of Medicine, Zakho, Iraq

== Israel ==
- The Ruth and Bruce Rappaport Faculty of Medicine, Technion, Haifa
- Ben-Gurion University of the Negev Medical School for International Health, Beersheba
- Joyce and Irving Goldman Medical School, Ben-Gurion University of the Negev, Beersheba/Negev
- Hebrew University-Hadassah School of Medicine, Hebrew University of Jerusalem, Jerusalem
- Sackler Faculty of Medicine, Tel Aviv University, Tel Aviv
- Medical school of the Bar-Ilan University and Rivka Ziv Hospital, Safed
- Adelson School of Medicine, Ariel University, Ariel

== Jordan ==
- University of Jordan – Faculty of Medicine, Amman
- Jordan University of Science and Technology – Faculty of Medicine, Irbid
- Hashemite University – Faculty of Medicine, Zarqa
- Mutah University – Faculty of Medicine, Karak
- Yarmouk University – Faculty of Medicine, Irbid
- Al-Balqaʼ Applied University – Faculty of Medicine, As-Salt

== Kuwait ==
- Kuwait University

== Lebanon ==
- Lebanese University
- Beirut Arab University
- Saint Joseph University
- University of Balamand
- Lebanese American University
- American University of Beirut
- Holy Spirit University of Kaslik

== Oman ==
- Sultan Qaboos University
- National University of Science and Technology

== Palestine ==
- Al-Quds University Faculty of Medicine
- An-Najah National University Faculty of Medicine and Health Sciences
- Hebron University College of Medicine
- Arab American University Faculty of Medicine
- Islamic University of Gaza Faculty of Medicine
- Al-Azhar University – Gaza Faculty of Medicine
- Palestine Polytechnic University College of Human Medicine

== Qatar ==
- Qatar University
- Weill Cornell Medical College in Qatar

== Saudi Arabia ==
- King Abdulaziz University, Jeddah
- King Saud University, Riyadh
- Imam Abdulrahman Bin Faisal University, Dammam
- King Faisal University, Al Ahsa
- King Khalid University, Abha
- Faculty of Medicine, King Fahad Medical City, Riyadh
- Prince Sattam bin Abdulaziz University, Al-kharj
- Alfaisal University, Riyadh
- Imam Muhammad ibn Saud Islamic University, Riyadh
- Umm al-Qura University, Makkah
- Taif University, Taif
- Qassim University, Buraidah
- Al Jouf University, Al Jouf
- Taibah University, Madinah
- King Saud bin Abdulaziz University for Health Sciences, Riyadh
- Ibn Sina National College for Medical Studies, Jeddah
- Najran University, Najran
- University of Hail, Hail Region.
- Tabuk University, Tabuk
- Majmaah University, Majmaah
- Princess Nourah Bint Abdul Rahman University, Riyadh
- Dar Al Uloom University, Riyadh
- Northern Borders University College of Medicine, Arar
- Sulaiman Al Rajhi University
- College of Medicine in Dawadmi, Shaqra University
- College of Medicine in Shaqra, Shaqra University
- Al Baha University
- Almaarefa University, Riyadh
- Vision Medical College, Jeddah
- University of Bisha, Bisha
- Batterjee Medical College, Jeddah

== Syria ==
- Faculty of Medicine, Damascus University
- Faculty of Medicine, University of Aleppo
- University of Kalamoon
- Faculty of Medicine, Homs University
- Faculty of Medicine, Latakia University
- Syrian Private University
- Al-Andalus University for Medical Sciences
- Faculty of Medicine, Al-Furat University
- Faculty of Medicine, Hama University
- Faculty of Medicine, Tartous University
- Al Hawash Private University Faculty of Medicine
- Al Sham Private University Faculty of Medicine

== United Arab Emirates ==
- United Arab Emirates University
- Dubai Medical University
- Gulf Medical University
- University of Sharjah
- Ajman University
- Khalifa University
- RAK Medical and Health Sciences University
- Mohammed Bin Rashid University of Medicine and Health Sciences

== Yemen ==
- Aden University
- Hadhramout University of Science & Technology
- Sana'a University
- University of Science & Technology
- Thamar University
- Ibb University
- Taiz university
- Al-Razi University
- 21 September University for Medical and Applied Science.
