= Women's education in Saudi Arabia =

Saudi Arabia is a theocracy organized according to the principles of Islam, which puts emphasis on the importance of knowledge and education. In Islamic belief, obtaining knowledge is the only way to gain true understanding of life, and as such, both men and women are encouraged to study. In 2021, women's college graduation rates exceeded those of men's.

== History ==
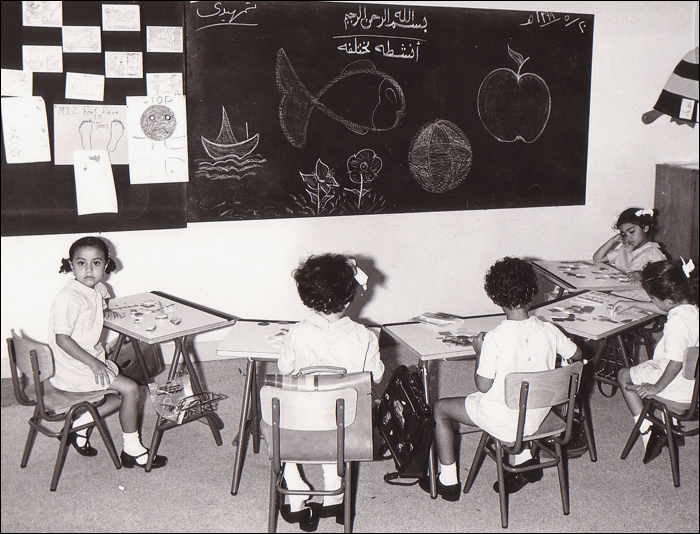
Girls at school 1960s/70s

Girls' education in Saudi Arabia was not formally addressed by the government until 1959. Women's education in Saudi Arabia was always thought of differently than that of men. The Quran teaches that the role of education for women is to serve as a guide on how to become the best wife they can be. This is due to the preconceived notion that women are meant to be mothers, nurturers, and housewives. Before public schools for girls were opened, women born into wealthy families could access education via in-home tutoring. In 1941, the first private school for girls was opened by Indonesian and Malawian immigrants, called Madrasat AlBanat AlAhliah. The first girls' public school was established in 1956 in Riyadh, called Dar Al Hanan. A large portion of the Saudi Arabian population was opposed to the implementation of women's education policy; in September 1963, the government had to deploy officials to forcibly restrain citizens in Buraydah who were protesting girls' education. According to Natana Delong-Bas, the suppression of women's education by contemporary Wahhabi regimes is due to their adherence to a specific interpretation of Wahhabi Islam.

In 1955, Queen (Princess at the time) Effat, King Faisal's Wife, of Saudi Arabia established "Dar Al Hanan", the first school for girls in the country. In 1959, King Saud addressed the nation, started a public Girl Education program. In 1960, "Kuliyat Al Banat" (The girl college) was launched, which was the first girl form of higher education in Saudi Arabia. By 1961 there were 12 elementary schools for girls and by 1965 there were 160. By 1970, there were 357 and by 1975 there were 963, and 1980 there were 1,810. By 1981, the number of girls enrolled in public schools almost equaled the number of boys.

In 2005, the Saudi government launched King Abdullah Scholarship Program (KASP), with over half of the scholarship beneficiaries being women. In 2015, 44,000 women had graduated from top universities in the US, East Asia, Europe, and more. The scholarship provided full-board scholarships for women including a year-round ticket, monthly stipend, full tuition coverage, free private tutoring, and even a monthly stipend and yearly ticket for a male family relative to travel with all the women students.

Until 2002, different departments regulated education for men and women. Women's education was controlled through the Department of Religious Guidance, while men's education was overseen by the Ministry of Education. The Department of Religious Guidance retained control of women's education to ensure that women were educated in accordance with the principles of Islam as interpreted in Saudi Arabia, which traditionally espoused that women take on 'gender appropriate' roles such as motherhood, housewifery, teaching, or nursing:"to bring her up in a proper Islamic way so as to perform her duty in life, be an ideal and successful housewife and a good mother, ready to do things which suit her nature as teaching, nursing, and medical treatment."

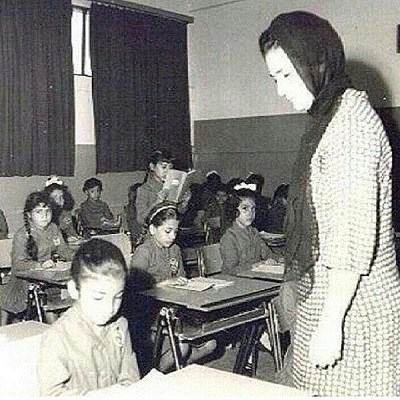
Iffat bint Mohammad Al Thunayan was an activist and pioneer for women's education in Saudi Arabia.

The amalgamation of departments for men's and women's education came as the result of a disaster in Mecca in 2002, where a group of 15 elementary schoolgirls died as a result of a fire in their school. The religious police designated by the Department of Religious Guidance discouraged the firemen from entering the school or allowing the girls to flee to safety, as there was the chance their hijabs were not being worn properly. It was discovered that women's education had received a lower budget than men's education, and thus girls' schools were outdated and unsafe which was a factor in the fatal fire. This led to public outrage, and in turn, the combination of men's and women's education departments into the Ministry of Education. Again in 2014, a female student at King Saud University died after the religious police officers stopped paramedics from entering.

The state of women's education in Saudi Arabia continues to evolve, but not without setbacks. In the Saudi Vision 2030 agenda, the Saudi government pledges to make adjustments that will improve women's education with plans to "invest in [women's] productive capabilities and enable them to strengthen their future and contribute to the development of our society and economy."

Obesity is a problem among middle and upper-class Saudis who have domestic servants to do traditional work but, until 2018, women were forbidden to drive and so they were limited in their ability to leave their home. As of April 2014, Saudi authorities in the education ministry have been asked by the Shura Council to consider lifting a state school ban on sports for girls with the proviso that any sports conform to Sharia rules on dress and gender segregation, according to the official SPA news agency. The religious police, known as the mutawa, imposed many restrictions on women in public in Saudi Arabia. The restrictions include forcing women to sit in separate specially designated family sections in restaurants, to wear an abaya and to cover their hair. However, in 2016, the Saudi cabinet has drastically reduced the power of the religious police and barred it "from pursuing, questioning, asking for identification, arresting and detaining anyone suspected of a crime", making them effectively "non-existent" in the public sphere anymore.

A few Saudi women have risen to the top of the medical profession; for example, Ghada Al-Mutairi heads a medical research centre in California and Salwa Al-Hazzaa is head of the ophthalmology department at King Faisal Specialist Hospital in Riyadh and was the late King Fahad's personal ophthalmologist.

== Segregation in social life ==
=== Education ===
In 1964, the first four girls' intermediate schools were opened. The first post-secondary education for girls was Princess Nourah Bint Abdulrahman University, established in 1970, which is also the largest women's university in the world. It was called Riyadh University for Women until 2008. A women-only campus, the Centre for Girls' Studies, opened at King Saud University in 1976. A girls' college was also established by King Faisal and his wife, Iffat, called Kulliyyat Al Banat. There are currently 36 universities in Saudi Arabia that allow women to enroll, with a number of them being for women only.

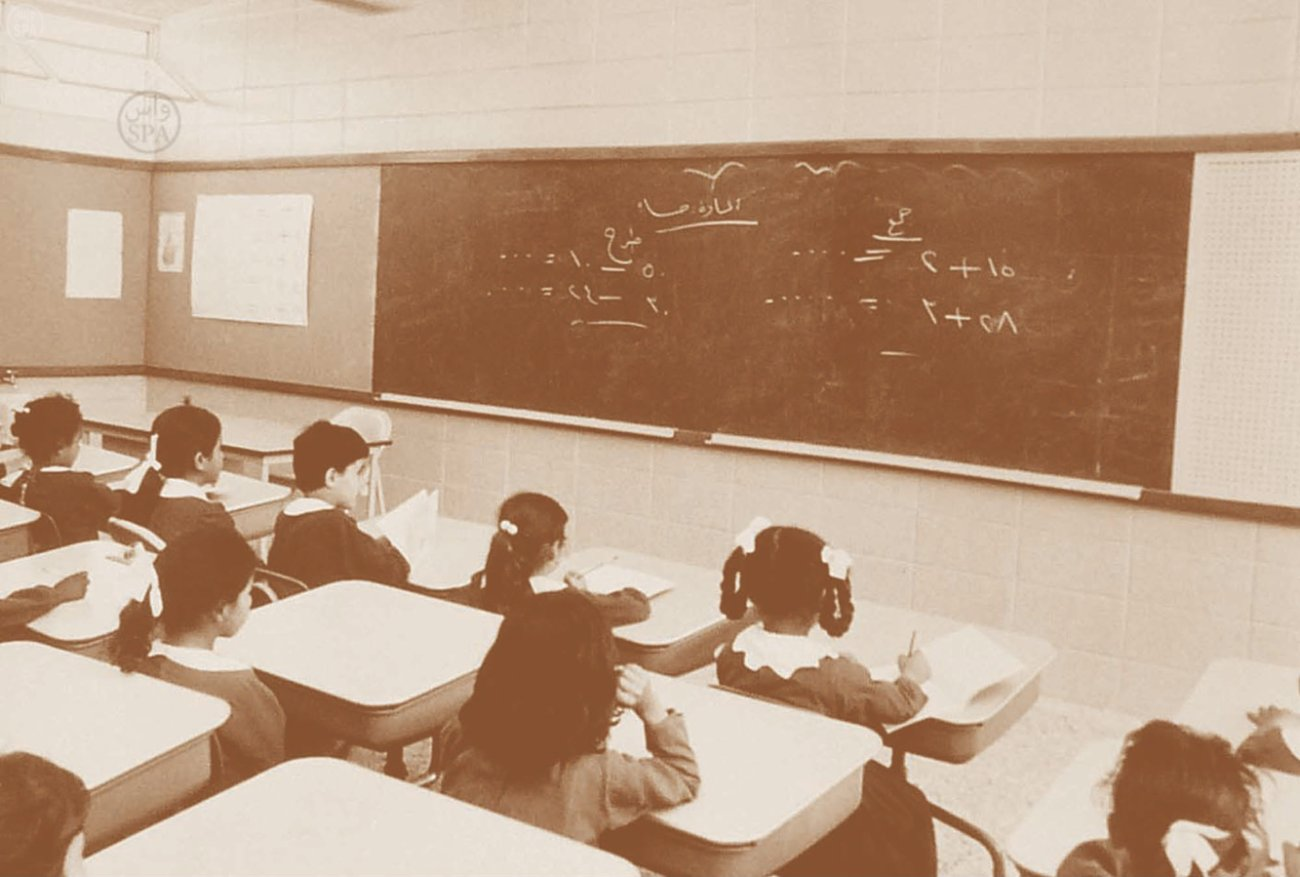
Mathematics class for Saudi Arabian girls in the 1960s

Within the education system, a guardian's permission is not required to enroll in schools and universities. However, as of February 2018, many private universities continued to require a guardian's signature as a condition for enrollment. In addition, husbands can withhold consent if women access scholarships to or travel for higher education abroad.

Progress for equality in girls' and women's education has been made since the implementation of girls' schools in Saudi Arabia. While the men's literacy rate has always been statistically higher than that of women, the women's literacy rate has consistently increased over the past decades. In 1992, women in Saudi Arabia had an average literacy rate of 57.28%. In 2017, the literacy rate for women was 99.3%. Statistics show an increase from 272,054 female enrolments in 1974–75 to 2,121,893 in 2004–05.

=== Laws ===
In Saudi Arabia, officials may ask women for their male guardians' consent. This can happen even when no law or guideline requires such consent. Current practices assume women have no power to make their own decisions. This can have a huge impact on how women can receive education in Saudi Arabia. One example of how women are checked for guardian consent is in many airports, officials ask women of all ages for written proof that their guardian has allowed them to travel. Many women have to receive consent to travel, even for educational reasons. Although the government has taken some steps to limit the power of guardians, there is little evidence showing that officials are backing down from guardian consent.

== Consequences of educational segregation ==
=== Labor market segregation ===
Women in Saudi Arabia continue to be marginalized almost to the point of total exclusion from the Saudi workforce. Saudi Arabia has one of the lowest rates of working women in the world. Women account for only 4% of the total workforce and 10.7% of the labor force. In recent years there has been an issue that has intensified the need for a larger labor force, and allowing women out of the home and into the economy. There has been integration of women in the workforce, but under religious customs, women continue to be secluded from men. In Saudi Arabia, there are no female judges or prosecutors. The government enforces sex segregation in all workplaces with the exception of hospitals. If the government discovers unlawful mixing of the sexes, they are authorized to arrest the violators and bring them to the nearest police station where they can be criminally charged. The Saudi Labor Code does not include anything requiring sex segregation in the workplace. However, there is little evidence that this has in any way affected the current work environment. The issue of guardianship is introduced and employers in both the private and public sector require female staff to obtain the permission of a male guardian in order to be hired. When women reach working age, employers often do not ask for permission, although the government requires teachers to provide such permission.

=== Political participation ===
Saudi Arabia is governed by sharia law. Sharia law is open to many interpretations, but it does not usually encourage women to hold prominent positions. In 2005 Saudi Arabia held its first nationwide elections. Women did not participate. They were not permitted to vote or run as candidates in the elections. With the exclusion of political participation, Abdulaziz Al-Heis contends that women will not be able to participate and find a platform to have their voice heard for equality and other demands. There needs to be a push forward and renewal of institutions for religious ideas so the political economy can include both men and women. Since 2015, women are allowed to vote and present themselves as candidates for the country's municipal elections.

== Scholarships and Vision 2030 ==
Scholarships in Saudi Arabia played a significant role in women Empowerment, as it prepared tens of thousands of women for the job market between the years of 2006 and 2012, which greatly contributed to increasing the level of education amongst Saudi women. In 2023, Saudi Arabia's Women college graduation rates surpass those of males, being one of the highest globally.

== List of universities that enroll women ==
There are currently 36 universities in Saudi Arabia that allow women to enroll, with a number of them being for women only.

- King Saud University
- King Abdulaziz University
- King Faisal University
- Umm Al-Qura University
- King Abdullah University of Science and Technology
- Imam Muhammad Ibn Saud Islamic University
- Institute of Public Administration
- Taibah University
- King Khalid University
- Alfaisal University
- Qassim University
- Najran University
- Jazan University
- Majmaah University
- Taif University
- Princess Nora bint Abdulrahman University (women only)
- University of Ha'il
- King Saud bin Abdulaziz University for Health Sciences
- Prince Sultan University
- Salman bin Abdulaziz University
- University of Dammam
- Prince Mohammad Bin Fahd University
- Al Jouf University
- University of Tabuk
- Shaqra University
- Baha University
- Effat University (women only)
- Northern Borders University
- University of Business and Technology
- Dar Al Uloom University
- Al Yamamah University
- Fahd bin Sultan University
- Dar Al-Hekma University (women only)
- Riyadh College of Dentistry and Pharmacy
- Batterjee medical college
- Ibn Sina National College for Medical Studies (men and women, but students are segregated)
