= UBT =

UBT or Ubt may refer to:

- UBT machine gun
- Unbitrium, symbol Ubt, hypothetical chemical element
- Urea breath test
- Uddhav Thackeray (born 1960), Indian politician

== Organizations ==
- Borneo Tarakan University (Universitas Borneo Tarakan), Indonesia
- UBT, a Canadian garage rock band formed by Mikey Heppner of Priestess
- Universal Business Team, a business network associated with the Plymouth Brethren Christian Church
- University for Business and Technology, Pristina, Kosovo
- University of Business and Technology, Jeddah, Saudi Arabia
