= Abdullah Asiri =

Saudi Arabian entrepreneur

Abdullah Asiri (born 1987) is a Saudi Arabian tech entrepreneur and the founder and CEO of Lucidya, a company that uses artificial intelligence (AI) to improve customer experiences.

== Biography ==
=== Early life and education ===
Abdullah was born in 1987 into the Asir tribe. Throughout his early life, he moved between several cities in Saudi Arabia. Abdullah Asiri earned a Bachelor of Science in Computer Engineering from Virginia Tech in 2011. In 2013, he completed a Master’s Degree in Computer Science with a focus on Artificial Intelligence at King Abdullah University of Science and Technology (KAUST). In 2019, he obtained a Master of Business Administration (MBA) in Business and Entrepreneurship from Prince Mohammed Bin Salman College of Business and Entrepreneurship (MBSC). He has also taken executive education courses at Stanford University, MIT, UC Berkeley, Cornell University, and Babson College in areas like global sales strategy and entrepreneurship.

=== Career ===
In 2011, Abdullah Asiri started his career in technology and entrepreneurship with his first startup, ShopMate, an AI-powered smartphone app that uses geofencing technology to assist shoppers and fashion enthusiasts in Saudi Arabia.

In 2012, he founded AnaJe3an, a food delivery app focused on college campuses. From December 2013 to August 2016, he served as founder and managing partner at Waqood Tech, a company focused on developing advanced technologies for enterprises and government.

In 2016, he founded Lucidya, the first AI company in the MENA region to secure venture capital funding. The company was recognized by the World Economic Forum for its innovative approach and significant impact and is considered one of Saudi’s champion companies by joining it in the Saudi Unicorn Program. From November 2016 to December 2019, Abdullah also worked as a tech consultant at the Badir Program, where he supported the startup ecosystem by advising emerging tech startups.

In 2019, he relocated to Riyadh, moving Lucidya’s headquarters from Jeddah to the capital. Also, Abdullah Asiri was a board member at FanniApp (October 2018 – November 2021) and Medyaf (July 2020 – November 2021). Since 2021, he served as an investor and board member at Nqoodlet and Nitros. He is an external member of the Advisory Council at Umm Al-Qura University and King Khaled University’s College of Science and Computer. Abdullah Asiri was named one of the "100 Entrepreneurs Shaping Saudi’s Future" by Forbes.

=== Public activities ===
Abdullah Asiri founded Jeddah IO, a developers' community, and was the President of the Saudi Club at Virginia Tech from 2008 to 2009 and the Robotics Team Leader at Virginia Tech from 2009 to 2010.

He mentored for Misk Accelerator and in Entrepreneurship Courses at the University of California, Berkeley, and served as a judge in the Arab Mobile Apps Challenge. He also served as a Graduation Project Evaluation Committee Member at Dar Al-Hekma College, a Student Council Member at King Abdullah University of Science and Technology (KAUST), and was a former member of the IEEE American Society, the National Society of Collegiate Scholars, and the Golden Key International Honour Society.
