= IREG Observatory on Academic Ranking and Excellence =

International nonprofit organisation

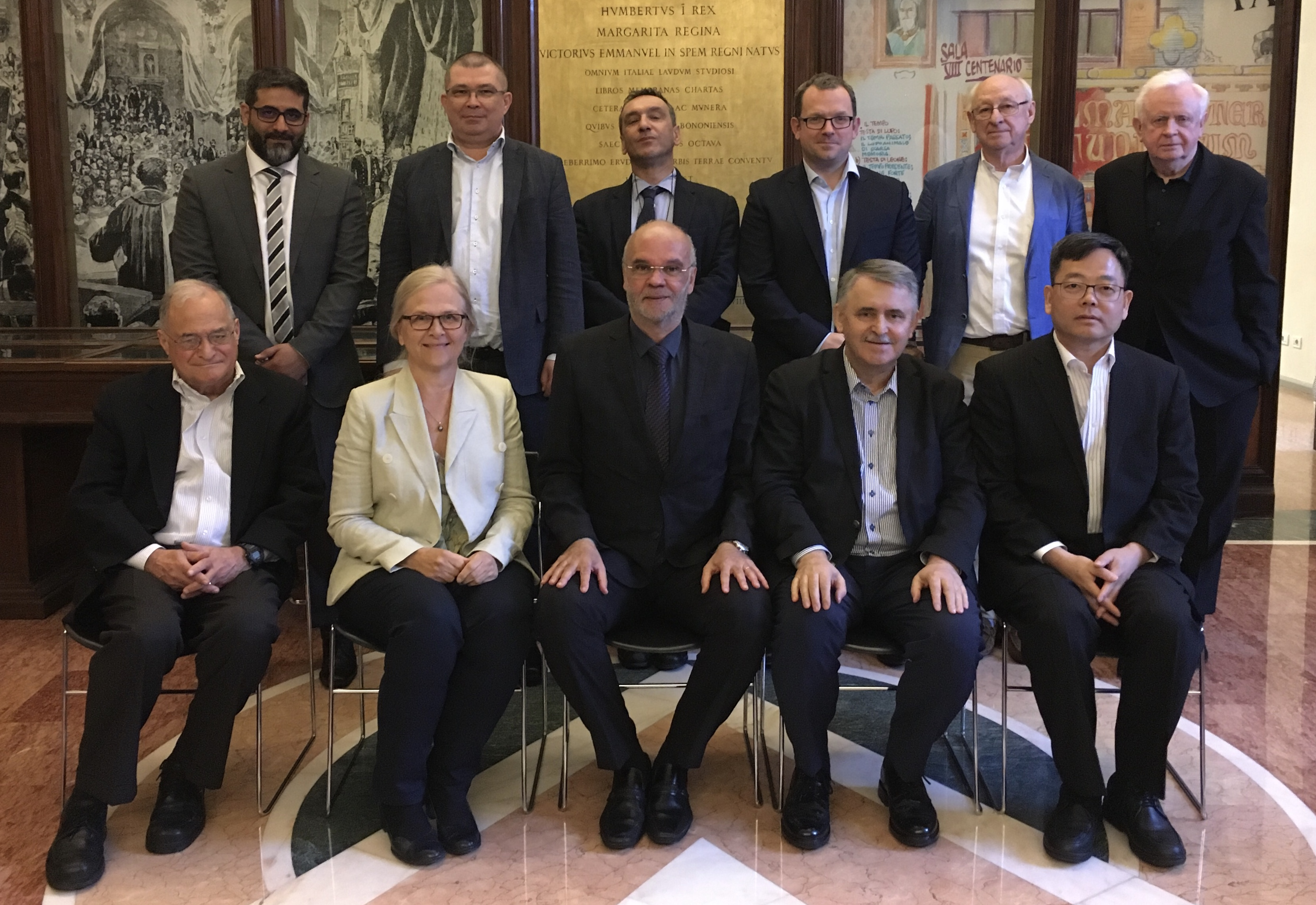
- IREG Executive Committee in Bologna 2019
- Company type: Nonprofit organization
- Headquarters: Warsaw, Poland
- Website: ireg-observatory.org

The IREG Observatory on Academic Ranking and Excellence (IREG Observatory) is an international nonprofit organisation created in 2009 consisting of universities, ranking organisations and third-party organisations associated with academics and university ranking. The organisation's secretariat is based in Warsaw, Poland.

Also, the organisation is responsible for awarding organisations with the IREG Ranking Seal of Approval acknowledging the recipient's engagement and initiatives in relation to university ranking.

== Foundation and purpose ==
IREG Observatory was first founded in Warsaw, Poland in 2002 and was in 2009 transformed into the non-profit organisation, IREG Observatory on Academic Ranking and Excellence, it is today. Its foundation was a result of a collaborative initiative between the UNESCO European Centre for Higher Education (UNESCO-CEPES) and a broad variety of ranking experts from different international ranking organisations.

The purpose of creating the International Ranking Expert Group (IREG) was to create a specialised community consisting of ranking analysts and experts to process a variety of issues and topics related to international university ranking.

In June 2015 it held a conference on Rankings by Subject which was considered significant.

== Executive Committee ==
Position	Name	Affiliated Organisation / Institution	Country of Residence
IREG President	Waldemar Siwinski	Founder Perspektywy Education Foundation	Poland
IREG Vice President	Gero Federkeil	Head of International Rankings at CHE Centre for Higher Education, Managing Director of U-Multirank	Germany
Executive Committee Member	Birte Hornemann	Aalborg University	Denmark
Executive Committee Member	Habib M. Fardoun	Excellence Consulting for Education]	Spain
Executive Committee Member	Robert J. Morse	U.S. News & World Report	United States
Executive Committee Member	Burkitbayev Mukhambetkali	Professor at Al Farabi University in Almaty	Kazakhstan
Executive Committee Member	Ying Cheng	CEO & Co-Founder at Shanghai Ranking Consultancy	China
Executive Committee Member	Gyorgy Fabri	Professor at Eötvös Loránd University	Hungary

== Initiatives ==
IREG Ranking Seal of Approval

- The organisation is responsible for awarding organisations with the IREG Ranking Seal of Approval acknowledging the recipient's engagement and initiatives in relation to university ranking.

Berlin Principles on Ranking of Higher Education Institutions.

- The Berlin principles is list of 16 principles that has been accepted as being indicators of what defines 'good' ranking and what topics should be considered in relation to ranking.

IREG Inventory of National Rankings

- The list on national rankings is an initiative which has the purpose of gathering and displaying various rankings in order to generate easy access to ranking information.

IREG List of International Academic Awards

- This list has been composed to function as a comprehensive map of international academic awards and rank these compared to one another.

IREG Guidelines for Stakeholders of Academic Rankings

- These Guidelines have been established to improve quality, assure reliability of information, and give the users of International rankings functionality and trustworthiness in term of gathering information on the topic. Furthermore, these Guidelines are supplemented by the findings of the other IREG initiatives in order to have a broad and comprehensive framework.

== Member organisations and institutions ==
Name of Institution / Organisation	Country	Location
Aalborg University	Denmark	Aalborg, Denmark
Agency for Science and Higher Education	Croatia	Zagreb, Croatia
Al-Farabi Kazakh National University	Kazakhstan	Almaty, Kazakhstan
Alma Mater Studiorum - University of Bologna	Italy	Bologna, Italy
Applied Science University (Bahrain)	Bahrain	Sitra, Bahrain
Atilim University	Turkey	Ankara, Turkey
Atyrau State University	Kazakhstan	Astana, Kazakhstan
Beijing University of Technology	China	Beijing, China
Centre for Higher Education	Germany	Gütersloh, Germany
CASEE - Hangzhou Dianzi University	China	Zhejiang, China
Eötvös Loránd University	Hungary	Budapest, Hungary
Erciyes University	Turkey	Kayseri, Turkey
Gdańsk University of Technology	Poland	Gdańsk, Poland
Hasselt University	Belgium	Hasselt, Belgium
Independent Agency for Accreditation and Rating	Kazakhstan	Astana, Kazakhstan
IQAA - Independent Agency for Quality Assurance in Education	Kazakhstan	Astana, Kazakhstan
Jagiellonian University	Poland	Kraków, Poland
Kabardino-Balkarian State University	Russia	Kabardino-Balkaria, Russia
Kazakh National Agrarian University	Kazakhstan	Almaty, Kazakhstan
Kazan Federal University	Russia	Tatarstan, Russia
King Abdulaziz University	Saudi Arabia	Jeddah, Saudi Arabia
King Saud University	Saudi Arabia	Riyadh, Saudi Arabia
Kozminski University	Poland	Warsaw, Poland
Kuwait University	Kuwait	Kuwait City, Kuwait
L. N. Gumilyov Eurasian National University	Kazakhstan	Astana, Kazakhstan
N. I. Lobachevsky State University of Nizhny Novgorod	Russia	Nizhny Novgorod, Russia
Moscow State University	Russia	Moscow, Russia
Lucian Blaga University of Sibiu	Romania	Sibiu, Romania
Lund University	Sweden	Lund, Sweden
MGIMO - Moscow State Institute of International Relations	Russia	Moscow, Russia
Nab'a Al-Hayat Foundation for Medical Sciences and Health Care	Iraq	Najaf, Iraq
National Center of Public Accreditation	Russia	Mari El Republic, Russia
National Research Nuclear University MEPhI	Russia	Moscow, Russia
National University of Political Studies and Public Administration	Romania	Bucharest, Romania
Perspektywy Education Foundation	Poland	Warsaw, Poland
Prince Sattam Bin Abdulaziz University	Saudi Arabia	Al-Kharj, Saudi Arabia
Qatar University	Qatar	Doha, Qatar
QS World University Rankings	United Kingdom	London, United Kingdom
RAEX Group	Russia	Moscow, Russia
RUDN University	Russia	Moscow, Russia
Russian New University	Russia	Moscow, Russia
Scientific Research Institute of Applied Information Technologies	Ukraine	Kyiv, Ukraine
Sejong University	South Korea	Seoul, South Korea
SGH Warsaw School of Economics	Poland	Warsaw, Poland
Shanghai Ranking Consultancy	China	Shanghai, China
Silesian University of Technology	Poland	Gliwice, Poland
Sumy State University	Ukraine	Sumy, Ukraine
The Illuminate Consulting Group	United States	San Carlos, California, United States
University of Indonesia	Indonesia	Depok, Indonesia
University of Bucharest	Romania	Bucharest, Romania
University for Business and Technology	Saudi Arabia	Jeddah, Saudi Arabia
University of Jeddah	Saudi Arabia	Jeddah, Saudi Arabia
University of Maribor	Slovenia	Maribor, Slovenia
University of Medicine, Pharmacy, Science and Technology of Târgu Mureș	Romania	Târgu Mureș, Romania
University of Navarra	Spain	Navarre, Spain
University of Ulsan	South Korea	Ulsan, South Korea
U.S. News & World Report	United States	New York City, New York, United States
Vistula University	Poland	Warsaw, Poland
Warsaw University of Technology	Poland	Warsaw, Poland
Yeditepe University	Turkey	Istanbul, Turkey
