= List of universities and colleges in Saudi Arabia =

This is the list of universities, colleges and institutes in Saudi Arabia.

== By province ==
| University/College | Foundation | City | Website |
Riyadh Region
| King Saud University | 1957 | Riyadh | www.ksu.edu.sa |
| Princess Nourah Bint Abdul Rahman University | 1970 | Riyadh | www.pnu.edu.sa |
| Imam Mohammad Ibn Saud Islamic University | 1974 | Riyadh | www.imamu.edu.sa |
| Prince Sultan University | 1999 | Riyadh | www.psu.edu.sa |
| College of Telecom & Information | 1985 | Riyadh | www.cti.edu.sa |
| Arab Open University | 2002 | Riyadh | www.arabou.org.sa |
| Riyadh College of Dentistry and Pharmacy | 2004 | Riyadh | www.riyadh.edu.sa, |
| Al Yamamah University | 2004 | Riyadh | www.alyamamah.edu.sa |
| Dar Al Uloom University | 2005 | Riyadh | www.dau.edu.sa |
| Alfaisal University | 2007 | Riyadh | www.alfaisal.edu |
| Arab East Colleges | 2008 | Riyadh | www.arabeast.edu.sa, |
| AlMaarefa University | 2008 | Riyadh | www.um.edu.sa |
| Prince Sattam Bin Abdulaziz University | 2008 | Al Kharj | www.psau.edu.sa |
| Al Farabi College of Dentistry and Nursing | 2009 | Riyadh | www.alfarabi.edu.sa, |
| Technical Trainers College | 2009 | Riyadh | www.ttcollege.edu.sa |
| Majmaah University | 2010 | Majmaah | www.mu.edu.sa |
| Shaqra University | 2010 | Shaqra | www.su.edu.sa |
| Saudi Electronic University | 2011 | Riyadh | www.seu.edu.sa |
Mecca Region
| King Abdulaziz University | 1967 | Jeddah | www.kau.edu.sa |
| Umm Al-Qura University | 1979 | Mecca | www.uqu.edu.sa |
| Leadership Community College | 2015 | Jeddah | |
| Jeddah College of Technology | 1987 | Jeddah | www.jct.edu.sa |
| Effat University | 1999 | Jeddah | www.effatuniversity.edu.sa |
| Dar Al-Hekma College | 1999 | Jeddah | www.daralhekma.edu.sa |
| Fakeeh College for Medical Sciences | 2003 | Jeddah | |
| University of Business and Technology | 2000 | Jeddah | www.ubt.edu.sa |
| Prince Sultan Aviation Academy | 2004 | Jeddah | www.fo.sv.net/psaa |
| Taif University | 2004 | Taif | www.tu.edu.sa |
| Taif College of Technology | 2003 | Taif | www.tvtc.gov.sa |
| Batterjee Medical College | 2005 | Jeddah | www.bmc.edu.sa |
| Arab Open University | 2006 | Jeddah | www.arabou.edu.sa |
| Prince Sultan College For Tourism and Business | 2007 | Jeddah | www.pscj.edu.sa |
| King Abdullah University of Science and Technology | 2009 | Thuwal | www.kaust.edu.sa |
| Jeddah Teacher's College | | Jeddah | www.jtc.edu.sa |
| College of Telecom & Electronics | | Jeddah | www.cte.edu.sa |
| Jeddah International College | | Jeddah | |
| Jeddah College of Health Care | | Jeddah | |
| Ibn Sina National College for Medical Studies | | Jeddah | www.ibnsina.edu.sa |
| University of Jeddah | 2014 | Jeddah | www.uj.edu.sa |
| Prince Mohammad bin Salman College of Business and Entrepreneurship | 2016 | King Abdullah Economic City | www.mbsc.edu.sa |
Medina Region
| Islamic University of Medina | 1961 | Medina | www.iu.edu.sa |
| Yanbu Industrial College | 1989 | Yanbu | www.yic.edu.sa |
| Al-Madinah College of Technology | 1996 | Medina | www.mct.edu.sa |
| Taibah University | 2003 | Medina | www.taibahu.edu.sa |
| Yanbu University College | 2005 | Yanbu | www.yuc.edu.sa |
| Madinah Institute for Leadership and Entrepreneurship (MILE) | 2010 | Medina | www.mile.org |
| Prince Mugrin University | 2017 | Medina | www.upm.edu.sa |
| Alrayan Colleges | 2018 | Medina | www.amc.edu.sa |
Eastern Province
| Mohammed Almana college of Medical sciences | 2003 | Dammam | www.machs.edu.sa |
| Dammam College of Technology | | Dammam | www.dct.gotevot.edu.sa |
| Dammam Community College | | Dammam | www.dcc.edu.sa |
| Al Ahsa College of Technology | | Al Ahsa | www.act.edu.sa |
| King Fahd University for Petroleum and Minerals | 1963 | Dhahran | www.kfupm.edu.sa |
| Imam Abdulrahman Bin Faisal University | 1975 | Dammam | www.iau.edu.sa |
| King Faisal University | 1975 | Al Ahsa | www.kfu.edu.sa |
| Jubail Industrial College | 1978 | Jubail | www.jic.edu.sa |
| Prince Sultan Military College of Health Sciences | 1988 | Dhahran | www.psmchs.edu.sa |
| University of Hafr Albatin | 2014 | Hafr Al-Batin | www.uhb.edu.sa |
| Jubail Technical Institute | 2005 | Jubail | www.jti.edu.sa |
| University College of Jubail | 2006 | Jubail | www.ucj.edu.sa |
| Qatif College of Technology | 2006 | Qatif | www.tvtc.gov.sa |
| University of Hafr al-Batin | 2014 | Hafr al-Batin | www.uohb.edu.sa |
| Arab Open University | 2006 | Dammam | www.arabou.edu.sa |
| Prince Mohammad University | 2006 | Khobar | www.pmu.edu.sa |
| Prince Sattam bin Abdulaziz University | 2010 | Al-Kharj | www.psau.edu.sa |
Asir Region
| King Khalid University | 1998 | Abha | www.kku.edu.sa |
| IBN Rushd College for Management Sciences | 1999 | Abha | www.ibnrushd.edu.sa |
Al Qassim Region
| College of Food and Environment Technology in Buraydah | 2000 | Buraydah | www.tvtc.gov.sa |
| Qassim University | 2004 | Al-Qassim | www.qu.edu.sa |
| Sulaiman Al Rajhi University | | Al Bukayriyah | www.sr.edu.sa/site/ |
Al Jawf Region
| Al Jawf University | 2005 | Sakakah | www.ju.edu.sa |
Jizan Region
| Jazan University | 2005 | Jizan | www.jazanu.edu.sa |
Ha'il Region
| University of Hail | 2006 | Ha'il | www.uoh.edu.sa |
Al Baha Region
| Al Baha University | 2006 | Al-Baha | www.bu.edu.sa |
Najran Region
| Najran University | 2006 | Najran | www.nu.edu.sa |
Northern Border Region
| Northern Borders University | 2007 | Arar | www.nbu.edu.sa |
Tabuk Region
| Tabuk University | 2006 | Tabuk | www.ut.edu.sa |
| Fahd bin Sultan University | 2003 | Tabuk | www.fbsu.edu.sa |
Multi Cities
| King Saud bin Abdulaziz University for Health Sciences | 2005 | Riyadh, Jeddah, Al-Ahsa | http://www.ksau-hs.edu.sa/ |
| Institute of Public Administration | | Riyadh, Jeddah, Mecca, Dammam | www.ipa.edu.sa |

== See also ==
- List of technical colleges in Saudi Arabia
