= Arab Medical School (disambiguation) =

Arab Medical School was the original name of the Damascus University - Faculty of Medicine.

It may also refer to:

- Arab Academy for Science, Technology and Maritime Transport College of Medicine
- Arab American University Faculty of Medicine
- Beirut Arab University

For a list of medical schools in the Middle East see List of medical schools in the Middle East.
