= Ghulail =

Ghulail is a neighborhood located south of Jeddah, Saudi Arabia.

Laws are poorly enforced in Ghulail. It is widely considered to be one of the most dangerous places in Jeddah, where corruption and crimes are extremely rife and current In the past. Now the area has many African expatriates illegally in Saudi Arabia. Many of them, who have advanced degrees, work as car washers; hence Ghulail is known as a "Car Washers' Area. In spite of that a lot of educated people live in Ghulail trying to fix and improve the wrong concepts about Ghulail as a crimes area "

Ibn Sina National College for Medical Studies is located in Ghulail.
