= Garin Artem =

Ukrainian memory champion

Garin Artem Vladimirovich (Ukrainian: Гарін Артем Володимирович)(born August 29, 1990 in Dresden, East Germany) — is a Ukrainian national memory champion, composer, founder and director of the Memory School at the Sumy State University.

== Biography ==
Artem Garin was born in Dresden in Soviet military family. In 1991, after dissolution of the Soviet Union, family moved to Sumy, Ukraine. In 1997 Artem entered Sumy Gymnasium №1, from which was successfully graduated in 2007. In the same year he entered Engineering Faculty (now Faculty of Technical Systems and Energy Efficient Technologies) in the Sumy State University. In 2012 Artem obtained complete higher education in the specialty "Manufacturing Engineering" and obtained qualification of Specialist in Mechanical Engineering.

== Ukrainian National Memory Record ==
On October 24, 2014 First National Memory Record was achieved. Artem made it by 5000 digits of pi reproduction. Exactly in 8 months, on June 24, 2015, Ukrainian phenomenal surpassed his previous success and achieved new National Memory Record by reproducing 10101 digits of Pi. Both records were recorded by Ukrainian National Register of Records. During official record achievement Artem also demonstrated the ability to name each number by its serial number, name some tens, hundreds and thousands whether direct or reverse. Specialists of Ukrainian National Register of Records registered that none of technical devices were used during the both record achievements. Consequently, phenomenal abilities of 24-year-old Ukrainian mnemonist were established as a fact. At this stage of development Artem Garin ranks 1st in the CIS and 7th in the world for maximum digits of Pi memorizing.

== Memory School ==
In early January 2015 in the Sumy State University “Memory School” was created. The idea was spearheaded by Artem Garin. At the present time founder and head of the school gives lessons to the different age groups of people. The main objective of Memory School is providing specialized knowledges about substance of memory, leaning technologies of its effective usage and creating conditions for the practical consolidation of skills. Overall, the course consists both lectures and practical classes, depending on the chosen program of studying. Artem Garin has repeatedly stated his intention to create a team of mentalists among talented Ukrainians and defend the reputation of Ukraine in the international arena.

== Creativity ==
Alongside his memory abilities Artem has been developing creative potential of his intelligence. The greatest legacy he has in the literature and music, which cuts a conspicuous figure in his life. In recent years, the phenomenon has been created over fifty compositions; most of them have gained considerable popularity among Internet users. In this field Artem Garin better known by his stage name “Metr d?A Nirag” (Ukrainian: "Метр д?А Нираг") (Гарін Артем у дзеркальному відображенні), Pseudonym was created as musician’s name in the mirror image. All compositions remain in copyright. Nevertheless, at the present point in time composer refuses the idea of public presentations.
