= Palladium Global Science Award =

The Palladium Global Science Award is an international scientific competition established in 2025 to support research into new uses of palladium. It recognizes scientific developments, research articles, and applied concepts involving palladium-based technologies. In its inaugural year, the competition received nearly 100 applications from more than 30 countries.

The China Precious Metals Industry Committee serves as the award’s general partner. Other partners include Shanghai Metals Market, North-West University (South Africa), and the MDX Research Center for Element Strategy at the Institute of Science Tokyo.

== Award categories ==
Best Scientific Development recognizes completed research that demonstrates new properties or potential applications of palladium. First place carries a prize of US$120,000, while second place receives US$60,000.

Best Scientific Article recognizes published research that advances the understanding or practical use of palladium chemistry. The prizes are US$80,000 for first place and US$40,000 for second place.

Best Applied Concept covers proposals for translating palladium research into industrial, technological, or environmental applications. It carries a single prize of US$50,000.

The total prize fund across the three categories is US$350,000.

== 2025 edition ==
Applications were reviewed by an International Expert Council chaired by Francis Verpoort of Wuhan University of Technology. The other members were Kyriaki Polychronopoulou of Khalifa University of Science and Technology, Dmitri Bessarabov of North-West University, Chao Chen of Tsinghua University, and Carl J. Boehlert of Michigan State University.

=== Best Scientific Development ===
Chao-Jun Li of McGill University was awarded first prize for developing a palladium-based photocatalytic system that uses light to activate methane and carbon dioxide. The process transfers an oxygen atom from carbon dioxide to methane, producing methanol and carbon monoxide.

Second prize went to Makoto Fujita of the University of Tokyo and the Institute for Molecular Science for his work on the metal-directed self-assembly of palladium-containing molecular cages and porous materials. This research also led to the crystalline sponge method for determining molecular structures.

=== Best Scientific Article ===
Natesan Thirupathi of the University of Delhi won first prize for research on CNN palladium(II) pincer complexes containing guanidinate ligands and their use in Suzuki–Miyaura coupling reactions.

Michael J. Krische of the University of Texas at Austin earned second prize for research on aryl-halide cross-coupling through formate-mediated transfer hydrogenation. The method uses sodium formate as a hydrogen-transfer agent and avoids the need to prepare organometallic coupling partners.

=== Best Applied Concept ===
Safa Faris Kayed of Prince Sattam bin Abdulaziz University received the award for PalladClear, a palladium-based photocatalytic device designed for the on-site degradation of hazardous dyes and pharmaceutical residues in industrial wastewater. The proposed system uses a fixed-bed reactor containing palladium complexes activated by ultraviolet or gamma radiation.
