= Saudi Electronic University =

University in Riyadh

- الجامعة السعودية الإلكترونية
- Logo of the Saudi Electronic University
- Type: Public, blended learning
- Established: October 8, 2011; 14 years ago
- President: H.E. Dr Mohammad Yahya Mardi Alzahrani
- Students: 37833
- Location: Riyadh, Saudi Arabia
- Campus: Saudi Arabia - Riyadh - Abu Bakr Siddiq Road
- Website: seu.edu.sa

The Saudi Electronic University (Arabic: الجامعة السعودية الإلكترونية), is a Saudi Arabian university that grants both undergraduate and graduate degrees. It was established by royal decree on 8 October 2011 to provide a combination of online and regular education known as blended learning.

In July 2020, Saudi Minister of Education, Hamad bin Mohammed Al Al-Sheikh, appointed Lilac AlSafadi as president of the Saudi Electronic University, to be the first female president of a Saudi university that includes students from both genders.

== History ==
On October 8, 2011, King Abdullah Bin Abdulaziz issued a royal decree to establish the Saudi Electronic University (SEU). This university will use the blended learning methods to offer both graduate and undergraduate degrees. The system of the SEU was built collaboratively with: University of Phoenix, Walden University, Capella University, eCampus Ohio University, Franklin University.

== Colleges ==
- College of Administrative & Financial Sciences (B.Sc., MBA)
- College of Computing and Informatics (B.Sc., M.S in Information Security, Master in Cyber Security)
- College of Health Sciences (B.Sc.)
- College of Science and theoretical studies (B.Sc.)

== See also ==
- List of universities and colleges in Saudi Arabia
