= University College of Jubail =

Jubail University College
- Established: 2006; 20 years ago
- Affiliations: Royal Commission for Jubail & Yanbu
- Location: Jubail, Saudi Arabia

Jubail University College, an affiliate of the Royal Commission for Jubail & Yanbu in Saudi Arabia, was established in 2006. It aims to achieve the objectives of the Royal Commission in developing human resources, and seeks to provide Saudi manpower with higher education and training, so that they can properly manage the Kingdom's growing economy in its various sectors.

JUC offers accredited undergraduate through post-graduate degrees in the arts and sciences, and has been regionally and nationally recognized for "...providing students with transformative educational experiences that are responsive to the needs of the community". The college has several research centers and laboratories that focus on topics such as renewable energy, water desalination, and advanced manufacturing.

== See also ==
- List of universities and colleges in Saudi Arabia
