= University of Business and Technology =

University in Jeddah, Saudi Arabia

- جامعة الأعمال والتكنولوجيا
- Motto: Education for Job Opportunities and Entrepreneurship
- Type: Private University
- Established: 2000; 26 years ago
- Founder: Dr. Abdullah Sadiq Dahlan
- President: Dr. Weam Tunsi
- Location: Jeddah, Saudi Arabia
- Website: Official website

The University of Business and Technology (UBT) (Arabic: جامعة الأعمال والتكنولوجيا), also known as UBT, is a private Saudi university established in 2000. Originally named the Institute of Business Administration, it became the College of Business Administration in 2003, and later, in 2012, it was restructured into a full university with four colleges: the College of Business Administration (CBA), the College of Engineering (CE), the Jeddah College of Advertising (JCA), and the College of Law (CL), in addition to an English Language Institute.

== History of the University ==
The Institute of Business Administration (IBA) was initially established in 2000 before it evolved into a university. The institute offered educational programs in four disciplines: Information Systems Management and Business Administration, Marketing, Accounting, and Finance, all at the diploma level. In 2003, the institute became the College of Business Administration (CBA) and moved to a new campus on Sari Street. In 2006, a new campus was opened in the northern part of Jeddah. In 2013, the College of Engineering and the College of Advertising were launched, and the institution officially became a university. In 2022, the University of Business and Technology (UBT) opened its new Corniche Building campus, spanning over 40,000 square meters. The grand opening was attended by Prince Khalid Al-Faisal, the Advisor to the Custodian of the Two Holy Mosques and Prince of Mecca.

== Colleges of the University ==
The university consists of several specialized colleges, including the College of Business Administration (CBA), the College of Engineering (CE), the Jeddah College of Advertising (JCA), and the College of Law (CL). It offers bachelor's degree programs as well as graduate-level programs.

=== Bachelor's Degree Programs ===
==== College of Business Administration (CBA) ====
- Accounting
- Finance
- Marketing
- Business Analytics and Information Systems
- Human Resources
- Supply Chain Management
- Retail Management
- Insurance and Risk Management
- Sports Management
- Hospitality and Tourism Management

==== College of Engineering (CE) ====
- Industrial Engineering
- Civil Engineering
- Electrical Engineering
- Mechanical Engineering
- Software Engineering
- Architecture Engineering
- Safety Engineering

==== Jeddah College of Advertising (JCA) ====
- Advertising Communications
- Advertising Management
- Creative Advertising Design

==== College of Law (CL) ====
- Law
- Private Law

=== Graduate Programs ===
- Master of Science (M.Sc.): Includes specializations such as Accounting, Finance, Marketing, Human Resource Management, Supply Chain Management, and Advertising.
- Master of Engineering Management (MEM).
- Master of Business Administration (MBA).

== Accreditations and Rankings ==
- Ministry of Education

The university is accredited by the Ministry of Education of the Kingdom of Saudi Arabia.

- Saudi Education and Training Evaluation Commission

The university has received full institutional accreditation from the Saudi National Center for Academic Accreditation and Evaluation, covering the period from 2024 to 2031, marking its third consecutive accreditation cycle. This accreditation reflects the university's commitment to applying the national quality standards approved by the Saudi Education and Training Evaluation Commission. Additionally, several programs within the university have received programmatic accreditation from the center.

- QS Ranking

According to the QS Stars rating system for 2024, the University of Business and Technology achieved a 5-star institutional rating, indicating strong performance in several areas.The university was also awarded a 5-star rating in the following categories: teaching, graduate employability, internationalization, campus facilities and infrastructure, and inclusiveness. Furthermore, the university advanced by 60 positions since its first QS ranking, with its 2025 position now at 67th out of 246 universities in the Arab world.

- Times Higher Education Impact Rankings

The University of Business and Technology is ranked among the top 400 universities globally in the Times Higher Education Impact Rankings. The university is recognized for its contributions to advancing the United Nations' Sustainable Development Goals, particularly in areas such as gender equality and economic growth.

== Memberships ==
- The Association of Arab Universities (AARU)
- The International Association of Universities (IAU)
- The IREG Observatory on Academic Ranking and Excellence
- The Principles of Responsible Management Education (PRME)
- AACSB, EFMD and AMBA.

== Campus ==
- North Obhur Branch

Located in the North Obhur area, 35 kilometers north of downtown Jeddah, the campus includes the College of Business Administration, the College of Engineering, the College of Advertising, and the College of Law, in addition to the General Administration Building, the English Language Building, and the central library. The campus also features student and faculty housing, a mosque, a game hall, a sports club, and a football field.

- Corniche Branch

Situated in the Corniche area, this branch includes colleges such as the College of Business Administration, the College of Advertising, the College of Engineering, and the College of Law. It also houses advanced facilities including modern classrooms, scientific laboratories, and research and training centers. Additional facilities at this branch include a conference hall, a library, a sports club, and a basketball court.

== Notable alumni ==
- Abdulaziz bin Turki Al Saud, Saudi Sports Minister.

== See also ==
- List of universities and colleges in Saudi Arabia
