= University of Prince Mugrin =

- Type: Private university
- Established: 2017; 9 years ago
- Location: Madinah, Saudi Arabia
- Website: Official website

University of Prince Mugrin is located in Madinah, Saudi Arabia. It was founded in 2017. The university is named after Prince Mugrin bin Abdulaziz Al Saud, who was a member of the Saudi royal family and a former intelligence chief.

The university has six colleges: the College of Business and Tourism, the College of Engineering, the College of Computer Science and Information Systems, the College of Architecture and Design, the College of Applied Medical Sciences, and the College of General Studies. UPM offers undergraduate and graduate programs across several fields of study, including business, engineering, computer science, law, and humanities.

== See also ==
- List of universities and colleges in Saudi Arabia
