= Jubail Technical Institute =

Educational Institute in Saudi Arabia

Jubail Technical Institute (JTI)
- المعهد التقني في الجبيل
- Established: September 2004; 21 years ago
- Director: Abdullah Al Huzaim
- Administrative staff: 250 +
- Students: 3,000 +
- Location: Jubail, Eastern Province, Saudi Arabia
- Nickname: JTI

The Jubail Technical Institute is an educational establishment in the Eastern Province of Saudi Arabia.

It was Inaugurated in 2004, under the umbrella of the Royal Commission for Jubail and Yanbu. The main purpose of the institute is to provide education and training in the fields of electrical, information technology, mechanical and manufacturing skills.

JTI offers a wide range of technical and vocational programs, with a focus on fields such as engineering, computer science, and industrial technology. The institute provides training to both men and women, with separate facilities and programs for each gender.

== See also ==
- List of universities and colleges in Saudi Arabia
