= University of Jeddah =

- جامعـــة جدة
- Type: Public
- Established: 2014
- President: Prof. Abdulfattah Suliman Mashat
- Location: Jeddah, Makkah, Saudi Arabia; 21°54′18″N 39°15′36″E
- Website: uj.edu.sa

University of Jeddah or Jeddah University (Arabic: جامعـــة جدة) is a public university located in Jeddah, Makkah, Saudi Arabia. The University of Jeddah was established in 2014 and recognized by the Ministry of Education in Saudi Arabia.

The university's main campus is on the Jeddah-Asfan Expressway, 20 km northeast of the King Abdullah Sports City. It has additional campuses in Al-Khomrah, Al-Faisaliyah, and Al-Rawdah.

The university offers undergraduate and graduate programs in various disciplines, including engineering, business, law, medicine, pharmacy, education, and social sciences. The university was the first university in Saudi Arabia to offer an undergraduate degree in Cybersecurity.

== Constituent colleges ==
- College of Medicine
- College of Applied Medical Sciences
- College of Computer Science and Engineering
- College of Engineering
- College of Science
- College of Business
- College of Sport Sciences
- College of the Holy Quran and Islamic Studies
- College of Education
- College of Art and Design
- College of Social Sciences
- College of Law and Judicial Studies
- College of Communication and Media
- College of Languages and Translation
- English Language Institute
- Community College
  College of Business - Alkamil
  College of Computer Science - Alkamil
  College of Science and Arts - Alkamil
  College of Business - Khulais
  College of Computer Science - Khulais
  College of Science and Arts - Khulais

== See also ==
- List of universities and colleges in Saudi Arabia
