= Fahd bin Sultan University =

Private university in Saudi Arabia

- Former names: Fahd bin Sultan College
- Type: Private university
- Established: 2003; 23 years ago
- Academic staff: nearly 50 (2010-2011)
- Location: Tabuk, Saudi Arabia; 28°27′55″N 36°29′57″E
- Website: Fahd bin Sultan University website

Fahd bin Sultan University (FBSU) is a private university in Saudi Arabia and the first private university in the country using English as a medium of instruction.

== History and profile ==
FBSU was established in Tabuk as a private college in 2003 under the patronage of Prince Fahd bin Sultan, governor of Tabuk Province. It initially included only College of Computing. In the academic year 2007-2008, a branch for female students was added, and the college was inaugurated by the late Sultan bin Abdulaziz. One year later, two colleges were added; the College of Engineering and of Business and Management. Therefore, the university is made up of three colleges, all focusing on technical fields. It provides undergraduate and postgraduates programs.

The campus of the university is 10 km away from Tabuk. In October 2011, it gained the status of the university. It is accredited by ABET.

== Governance ==
The university is governed by a board of trustees chaired by Prince Fahd. Abdallah I. Husein Malkawi is the president of the University.

== Partnership ==
FBSU is in close relationship with American University of Beirut that provides technical and consultative support. The collaboration between the two institutions began in 2006. In April 2013, FBSU joined the SAP University Alliance Program, being the eleventh Saudi university that is part of the program.

== See also ==
- List of universities and colleges in Saudi Arabia
