= Fatemiye University of Medical Sciences, Qom =

Fatemiye University of Medical Sciences (Persian: دانشگاه علوم پزشکی فاطمیه قم) was a women's college of medicine in the city of Qom in central Iran. It was liquidated in 2013.
