= Al Baha University =

University in Saudi Arabia

Coordinates: 19°59′40″N 41°29′0″E

Albaha University
- جامعة الباحة
- Type: Public university
- Established: 2006; 20 years ago
- President: Abdullah Alhussain
- Location: Al Baha, Saudi Arabia
- Website: Official website

Albaha University is a university in Al Baha city, the capital of Al Baha province, Saudi Arabia. It is a public university that was founded in 2006. The president of the university is Prof. Dr. Abdullah Alhussain. The main campus is at Alaqiq about 25 km (16 mi) away from Al Baha city. The other campuses are in Almikhwah, Almandaq, and Baljurashi. The land of the main campus in Alaqiq occupies about 6.7 km^{2}. The university emphasizes public services in all of its disciplines. A new organization project at the university was named a lighting platform that was established by students. The idea of the platform is to spread the support of university students and for all levels as well.

== Faculties ==
Al Baha university consists of 11 faculties:

- The faculty of Medicine
- The faculty of clinical pharmacy
- The faculty of Engineering
- The faculty of Applied Medical Sciences
- The faculty of Administrative and financial sciences
- The faculty of Science
- The faculty of Education
- The faculty of Arts and Humanities
- College of Science and Arts in Almikhwah
- College of Science and Arts in Almandaq
- College of Science and Arts in Baljurashi
- Community College

== Departments ==
- Faculty of Medicine
- Faculty of Science
  - Physics Department
  - Chemistry Department
  - Mathematics Department
  - Biological Sciences Department
  - Computer Science Department
  - Information System (IS) Department
- Faculty of Engineering:
  - Mechanical Engineering Department
  - Civil Engineering Department
  - Electrical Engineering Department
  - Architecture Department
  - Computer Engineering Department
- Faculty of Education
  - Special Education Needs Department
  - Fine arts Department
  - Physical Education Department
  - Curriculum and Teaching Methodology Department
  - Teaching Technology Department
  - Psychology and Education Department
  - Educational Planning and Administration Department
- Faculty of Applied medical sciences
  - Medical Laboratory Department
  - Community Health Department
  - Dental Health Department
  - Nursing Department
  - Optometry Department
  - Physiotherapy Department
  - Radiology Department
  - Clinical Technology Department
- Faculty of Arts and Humanities
  - Foreign Languages Department
  - Arabic Language Department
  - Islamic Studies Department
- Faculty of Administrative and Financial Sciences
  - Business Administration Department
  - Accountancy Department
  - Information Technology Administration Department
  - Marketing Department
  - Banking and Financial Sciences Department
  - Health Administration Department
  - Law Department
- Community College

In addition there are three other campuses:

- College of Arts and Science in Baljurashi
- College of Arts and Science in Al-Mandaq
- College of Arts and Science in Almikhwah

== See also ==
- List of universities and colleges in Saudi Arabia
