= Sumy State University =

Public university in Sumy, Ukraine

Coordinates: 50°53′32″N 34°50′30″E

- ДЗВО "Сумський державний університет"
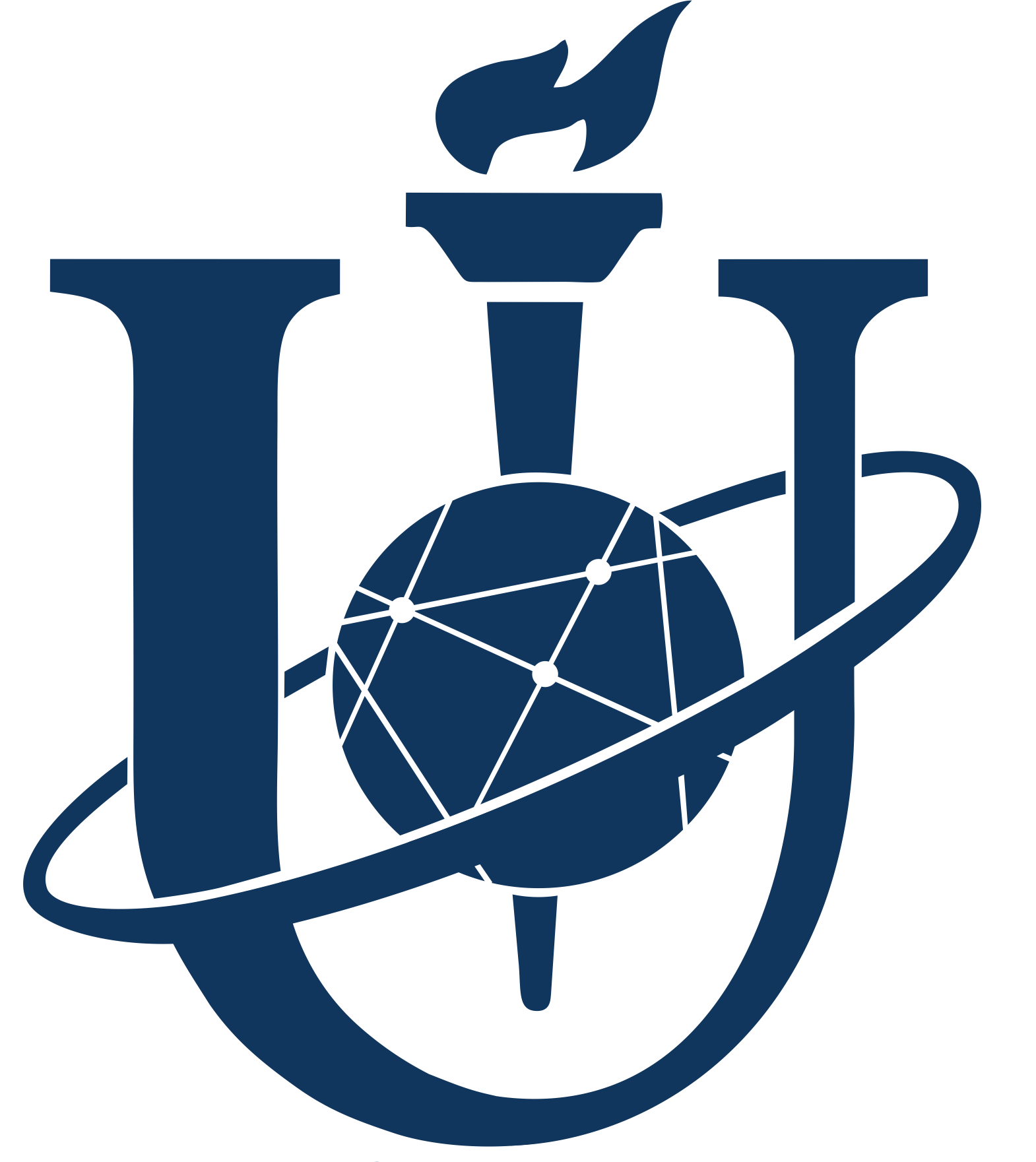
- University logo
- Motto in English: Qualitative education – secure future
- Type: Classical university
- Established: 1948 as department of Kharkiv Polytechnic Institute; 1966 as a branch of the Kharkiv Polytechnical Institute; 1990 as the Sumy Institute of Physics and Technology; 1993 as Sumy State University
- Affiliations: Ministry of Education and Science of Ukraine
- Academic affiliations: European Universities Association, ORCID
- Rector: Vasyl D. Karpusha
- Location: Sumy, Ukraine
- Campus: Urban
- Website: Official website
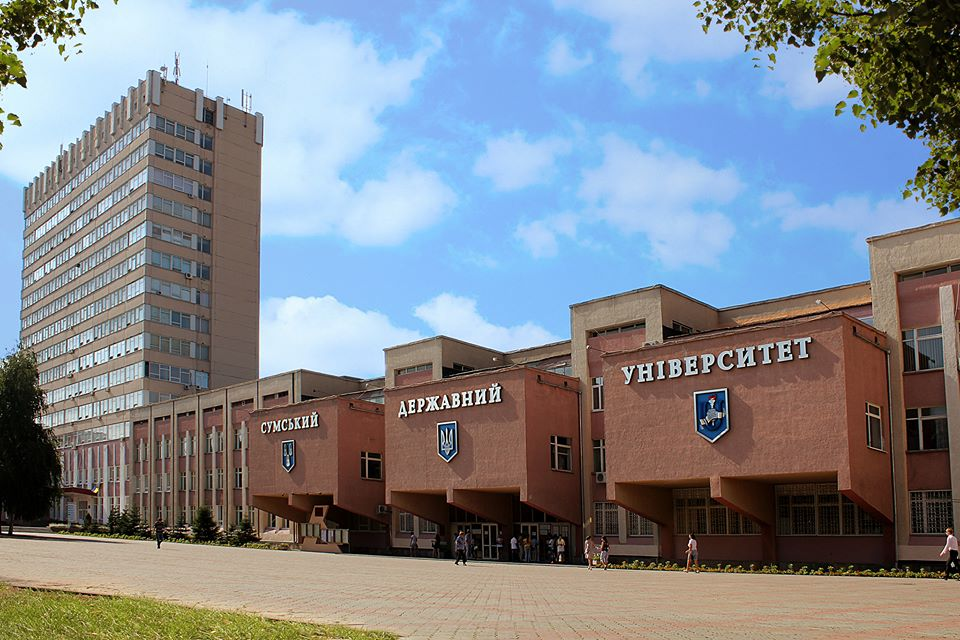

University rankings

Regional – Overall
- QS Emerging Europe and Central Asia: 122 (2022)

The Sumy State University (abbr. SumDU, Ukrainian: ДЗВО "Сумський державний університет", СумДУ) is a state-sponsored institution of higher education in Sumy, Ukraine. It enrolls about 12,000 students pursuing pre-undergraduate, undergraduate, specialist, and master degrees in 55 majors and 23 fields. About 1,900 foreign students represent almost 50 countries worldwide.

== History ==
The establishment of the University is connected with the development of the Sumy Machine-Building Plant, named after M.V. Frunze. During this period, a significant proportion of engineering and managerial roles were occupied by individuals with secondary specialized education. In February 1948, a joint directive from the Union ministries of higher education, machine-building, and instrument-making facilitated the creation of a training and consulting center (TCC) within the factory premises. This center was affiliated with the Moscow Correspondence Institute of Small-Scale Industry, later evolving into the All-Union Correspondence Machine-Building Institute.

On July 30, 1948, an order issued by Sumy Machine-Building Plant named after M.V. Frunze. The TCC, led by V. I. Popov—an alumnus of the Teachers' Institute, a war veteran, and a deputy head of the enterprise's staff department contributed to the foundation. The initial enrollment for the first academic year began in August 1948.

In 1958, due to the reorganization process aimed at establishing the Ukrainian Distant Polytechnic Institute (UDPI), the TCC was incorporated into its organizational framework. Subsequently, in May 1960, the Sumy General Technical Faculty of UDPI was established, building upon the foundation laid by the TCC. Further organizational changes led to the transformation of Sumy General Technical Faculty into the Sumy Department of Kharkiv Polytechnic Institute in 1966, with O.H Inozemtseva appointed as its inaugural director.

The progress and growth of the Sumy educational institution were significantly influenced by the leadership of I.H. Kovalev, who served as the rector from 1993 to 2004. Under his guidance, the initial KhPI department evolved into.

On 23 December 2015 with the resolution of Cabinet of Ministers of Ukraine №1388-r, the Ukrainian Academy of Banking was reorganized by joining SSU.

In 2016−2018 the university entered the group of leaders of the Ukrainian scientific and educational space, according to the international QS, Times, Shanghai rankings as a higher education institution with a high scientific constituent.

On March 4, 2022, a large explosion occurred near the building. The blast occurred during the ongoing Russian invasion of Ukraine.

== Academics ==
University rankings

Global – Overall
- THE World: 1001+

Institutes: Medical Institute, Oleg Balatskyi Academic and Research Institute of Finance, Economics and Management, Academic and Research Institute of Business Technologies "UAB", Academic and Research Institute of Law, Konotop and Shostka Institutes, Chemical and Technological College of Shostka Institute; faculties: of Electronics and Information Technologies, Foreign Philology and Social Communications, Technical Systems and Energy Efficient Technologies, Industrial Pedagogical Technical School of Konotop Institute, Polytechnic School of Konotop Institute, Chemical and Technological College of Shostka Institute and other structural departments. There are more than 3000 employees in the university, including Corresponding Members of the National Academy of Science of Ukraine, about 150 Doctors of Sciences, Professors, Associate Professors represent academic staff of the University. There are postgraduate and post-doctoral programmes in 24 majors, degree awarding academic councils with over 700 PhD candidates. The library has over 3 million items and won the All-Ukrainian contest “Library of the Year”. There is a TOEFL-center, and educational centers of companies including Microsoft, Cisco, PortaOne, Delcam, Netcracker, 1С, Siemens, SAS, and MindK operate at SumDU campus. Sporting achievements include participants at the Olympic Games, World, European and Ukrainian Championships. The students of the university have an opportunity to develop and improve their skills in 16 clubs in accordance with their interests. There are vocal, instrumental, jazz ensembles, rock bands, dance clubs, drama groups, theater of variety miniatures, folk ensembles, literary and creative workshop and others.

=== Structure ===
Institutes: Konotop Institute, Shostka Institute, Medical Institute, Oleg Balatskyi Academic and Research Institute of Finance, Economics and Management, Academic and Research Institute of Business Technologies "UAB", Academic and Research Institute of Law

Faculties: Foreign Philology and Social Communications, Technical Systems and Energy Efficient Technologies, Electronics and Information Technology, Faculties in Shostka and Konotop Institutes

Centers: Сenter of part-time, distance and evening studying, Center of postgraduate education, Linguistic Training Center

Department: Department of International Education

Colleges and Technical Schools: Machine Building College, Industrial Pedagogical Technical School of Konotop Institute, Chemical and Technological College of Shostka Institute, Polytechnic School of Konotop Institute

Library: Library of Sumy State University

=== Campus ===
- Main campus of SumDU: Central building, New building, Main building, Electronics&Technology building, Library & Information Center, M-building, LA-building, T-building" (2, Rymskoho-Korsakova St., Sumy, Sumy region);
- Campus of the Medical Institute of SumDU (31, Sanatorna St., Sumy, Sumy region);
- Campus of Machine Building College of Sumy State University (17, Taras Shevchenko avenue, Sumy, Sumy region);
- Campus of Konotop Institute of SumDU (24, av. Myru, Konotop, Sumy region);
- Campus of Shostka Institute of SumDU (1, Institutska St., Shostka, Sumy region);
- Campus of Academic and Research Institute of Business Technologies "UAB": academic building №1, academic building №2, academic building №3 (57, Petropavlivska St., Sumy, Sumy region).

=== Scientific journals ===
- Visnyk of Sumy State University;
- Journal of Engineering Sciences (JES);
- Journal of Nano- and Electronic Physics (JNEP);
- Journal of Сlinical and Experimental Medical Researches (JC&EMR);
- Philological Treatises («Filologichni Traktaty»).

== International relations ==
The University is a signatory of Magna Charta Universitatum and Talloires Declaration, a reliable member of the International Association of Universities, European University Association, Association of Economic Universities of South and Eastern Europe and the Black Sea Region, IREG Observatory on Academic Ranking and Excellence, IIENetwork and other international organizations.

Sumy State University cooperates with more than 280 partners from 50 world countries, including the USA, Great Britain, Germany, Austria, France, Belgium, Sweden, Poland, Lithuania, Bulgaria, the Czech Republic, Slovakia, Romania, Japan, South Korea, China and other countries of the world.

SumDU is a partner for joint projects in frames of international grant programmes of EU (Erasmus+, Horizon 2020), United Nation Development Programme, NATO, DAAD, American Councils, British Council, the World Bank, bilateral scientific and research projects, grants of private foundations. The University accomplishes more than 300 grants annually. For the last 5 years, the amount of research work in frames of international grant projects has increased 20 times.

== Rectors ==
- Popov Vasyl Ivanovych (1948–1960);
- Korol Oleksandr Nykyforovych (1962–1965);
- Inozemtsev Oleh Hnatovych (1965–1966);
- Maliushenko Volodymyr Vasylyovych (1967–1971);
- Movchan Oleksandr Vasylyovych (1971–1972);
- Kovalov Ihor Oleksandrovych (1972–2004);
- Vasylyev Anatoliy Vasylyovych (2004–2021);
- Vasyl D. Karpusha (2021–).

== SumDU during the full-scale war ==
"N" building of the university after Russian attack on 18 August 2025

=== Attacks ===
During Russian invasion of Ukraine the university suffered significant damage from Russian attacks. On September 3, 2024, one of the university buildings was partially destroyed. On April 13, 2025, the Russian army launched missiles on the congress hall and the building with the assembly hall. On the night of August 18, 2025, one more building was destroyed by a drone attack. The last two strikes destroyed, among other things, 60,000 books.

=== Support of foreign students ===
On the first day of Russia's war against Ukraine, Sumy became one of the first cities to be hit by the enemy. Nine hours after the invasion, Sumy kept the first fighting, enemy vehicles were on fire, and tanks were driving around the city. Because of this, Sumy was surrounded by Russian troops from the first day of the war. Not only civilians but also foreign students of SumDU stayed in the city. Of more than 2,000 foreign students of SumDU, about 1,700 were in Sumy at the beginning of the war who were unable to leave their homes before the start of hostilities.

The safety of international students immediately became one of the university's top priorities. SumDU provided students with food and basic necessities, equipped dormitories with safe shelters to accommodate all students in case of bombings.

It was not possible to leave Sumy safely for 12 days. At that time, the enemy used the stay of foreign students in the city for propaganda purposes spreading fakes and false information. The university provided students with everything they needed - food and water when after the bombing in the areas of dormitories there were problems with water supply. Also, students were constantly supported by the administration, teachers, and other students, negotiations with embassies continued.

Tensions rose after the bombing the critical infrastructure of the city, the electricity, water, heating, and communications were cut off for a time. The university made every effort to overcome the consequences of the impact - installed additional autonomous generators, relocated some students, increased the amount of supplied water. But in general, the emotional state of foreign students has deteriorated.

On March 8, the first so-called "green corridor" was agreed upon, the evacuation process began and foreign students were the first who left the city. All 1,700 foreign students of SumDU safely reached Poltava, and then western Ukraine, where there were no active hostilities on that day. From there, foreign students left Ukraine with the assistance of the embassies of their countries.

The number of people who wanted to leave the city was big, so the university provided its own transport to the citizens for evacuation.

=== Bomb shelters on the territory of SumDU ===
The city of Sumy has been subjected to air and artillery shelling several times. There are not many specialized bomb shelters in Sumy, the vast majority of them have been since the Second World War. Experts do not advise hiding in the basements of high-rise buildings, because there is a risk of buildings falling. That is why the university opened bomb shelters for citizens, residents of the districts. Sumy residents, who live not far from the university campuses, come to the beginning of the curfew and spend the night in the university shelters. For example, on March 12, enemy planes dropped five bombs near SumDU, which damaged more than 100 university windows. However, the people in the shelter were not injured. The university has promptly eliminated the consequences of the bombing and continues to operate (as far as the security situation allows).

=== Providing the Territorial Defense with products ===
The war caught all Ukrainians by surprise, neglecting a large number of plans. But SumDU staff tried to react quickly and help the community. In addition to the catering complex of the university helping to provide food for international students, the products to be used during events in the early days of the war were used to prepare lunches for the Territorial Defense of the city. And now, for the third week in a row, the SumDU public catering complex has been constantly engaged in baking bread and other products for the needs of the Territorial Defense and other categories of the population.

=== Information resistance ===
The staff prepared and sent more than 2,000 address letters with true information about the war in Ukraine.

Students regularly record and post videos on social media telling the truth about the Russian invasion.

Representatives of SumDU communicate with foreign media, more than 100 media outlets have already reported on how foreign students from different countries stayed in the occupied city of Sumy.

All social networks of the university work to inform people abroad to support Ukrainians with patriotic content, advice from psychologists, and doctors.

Medical students also organized webinar on first aid, and student psychologists conduct a series of webinars on psychological resilience.

Students and staff are members of the movement of blood donors, which is also actively illustrated on the pages of SumDU in social networks.

== Podcast ==
=== Podcast project "Higher education in Ukraine" ===
Each issue of the project is dedicated to a separate direction of the university's activity: the organization of the educational process, the peculiarities of training in various specialties, cooperation with international partners, etc. The heroes of the podcast are teachers, scientists, and students of Sumy State University. They talk about current areas of scientific research, innovative technological solutions, international grant programs, and interesting educational projects. Invited guests cooperate with foreign publications and universities and provide advice to young scientists and students who are starting their careers.

== See also ==
- Sumy National Agrarian University
- List of universities in Ukraine
