= Sulaiman Al Rajhi Colleges =

Private research university in al-Bukayriyah, Saudi Arabia

Sulaiman Al Rajhi University Jamiat Sulaiman Al Rajhi
- جامعة سليمان الراجحي
- Type: Private Non-profit Research University
- Established: 2009; 17 years ago
- Chairman: Sheikh Sulaiman Abdul Aziz Al Rajhi
- Dean: Prof. Mohammad Bin Abdullah Almohaimeed
- Location: Al Bukayriyah, Al-Qassim, Saudi Arabia; 26.141740°N 43.731889°E
- Campus: Urban 10,200 hectares (25,000 acres)
- Colours: Royal Blue and White
- Nickname: SRC, SRU.
- Website: sr.edu.sa

Sulaiman Al Rajhi University (Arabic: جامعة سليمان الراجحي) is a private research university in al-Bukayriyah, Qassim Province, Saudi Arabia, comprising three private institutes that offer courses in medicine, nursing and applied medical sciences. Established in 2009, it is named after the Saudi businessman and billionaire Sulaiman bin Abdulaziz al-Rajhi], who is the eponymous founder and inaugural chairman of the university.

== Aim and vision ==
Sulaiman Al Rajhi University aims are to produce highly trained and specialized cadres of manpower as required for development. The project of establishing the Medical, Nursing and Applied Medical Sciences Colleges with a University Hospital is envisaged to further improve the health sciences education, patient care and biomedical research to match international standards. The rationale behind establishing the university is due to a calculated estimate demand for higher education in the kingdom.

== Campus ==
The university's main campus is near the Madinah-Riyadh Highway SRC's campus is specifically located beside the highway connecting Riyadh and Madinah and sits approximately 370 km from the capital city of Riyadh. When completed it will cover an area of 10,100 hectares.

== Governance ==
As of January 2008, Professor Dr. Saleh Bin Abdullah Al Damegh was named the chief supervisor and founding dean of Sulaiman Al Rajhi University. In his concluding statement Sheikh Al Rajhi indicated that the general supervision of the university has been commissioned to Prof. Dr. Saleh Bin Abdullah Al Damegh, for his long academic background and wide experience in the field of medicine.

== Partnerships ==
=== University of Maastricht & UMC+ ===
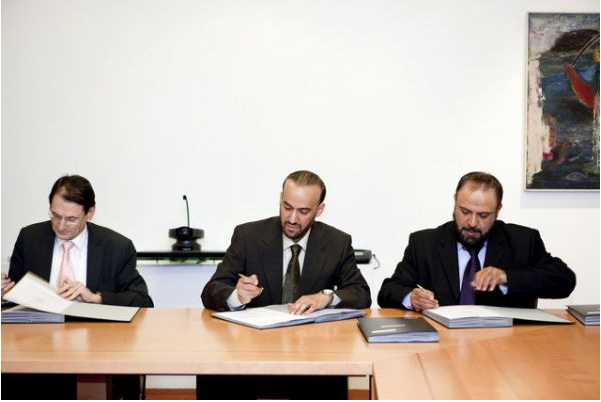
From right to left: Prof. Saleh Al Damegh, Dr. Khalid Al Rajhi and Prof. Martin Paul sign the contract agreement on December 18, 2008.

In the pursuit of creating the "Islands of Excellence," Sulaiman Al Rajhi University signed a memorandum of understanding under the patronage of H.E. Dr. Khalid bin Mohammad Al Angary, the Saudi Minister of Higher Education, H.E. Ms. Maria Josephina Arnoldina, Netherlands Minister of Economic Affairs, and in the presence of Dr. Mohammed Al Ohali, the ministry's deputy for education.

=== KPMG ===
The agreement between KPMG and SRC forms the basis of an extensive and intensive effort by the University and KPMG to build world-class organizational and operational capacity of SRC. The university seeks to primarily focus on delivering medical and health science education and will include a university hospital to serve the local community as well as the doctors-to-be.

== Teaching ==
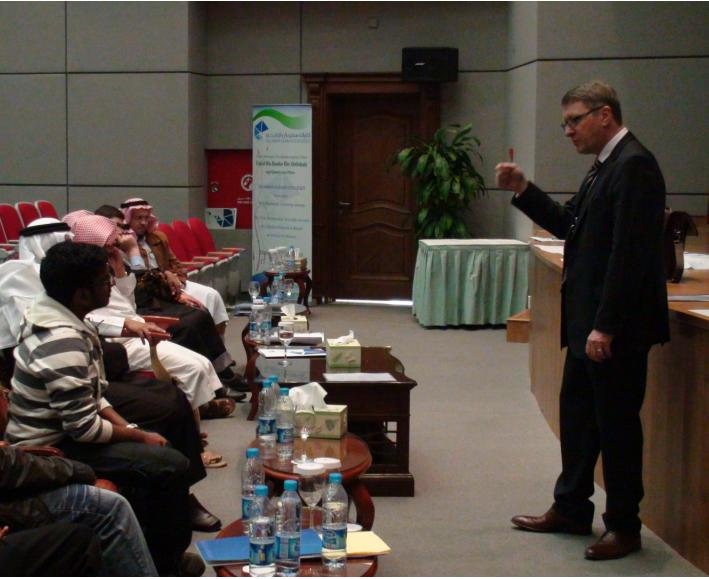
Prof Cees van der Vleuten discussing with students during one of the PBL workshops.

The university are primarily health and research centered and, as such, English is the medium of instruction at SRC. The medical education of SRC is based upon the medical curriculum of Maastricht University therefore students enrolled at Sulaiman Al Rajhi University will be taught using the education methodology of problem-based learning (PBL). In line with Maastricht's PBL philosophy, SRC believes that the students should be personally responsible for their academic education.

== Medical departments ==
The SRC Medical College will begin its first ever problem-based learning (PBL) medical program in late September 2010, in accordance to Maastricht University new academic year of 2010-2011. The medical college would comprise the following departments:

- Department of Physiology
- Department of Biochemistry
- Department of Anatomy
- Department of Pathology
- Department of Microbiology & Clinical Parasitology
- Department of Pharmacology & Clinical Therapeutics
- Department of Forensic Medicine/Medical Jurisprudence
- Department of Family & Community Medicine
- Department of Internal Medicine (including Psychiatry, Dermatology, Neurology, Cardiology & Radiology)
- Department of Surgery (including Orthopedics, ENT, Ophthalmology & Anesthesiology)
- Department of Obstetrics & Gynecology
- Department of Pediatrics
- Department of Medical Laboratory Science

== Additional images ==
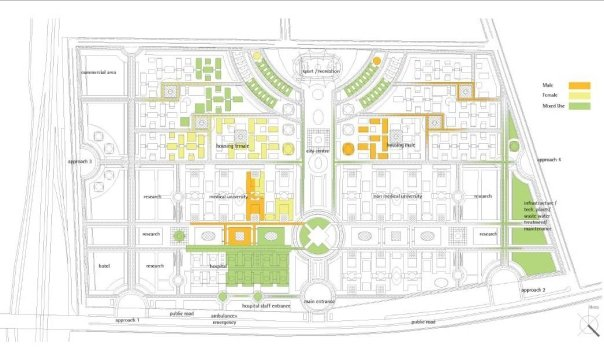

== See also ==
- List of universities and colleges in Saudi Arabia
