= Prince Mohammed Bin Salman College of Business and Entrepreneurship =

College in King Abdullah Economic City, Saudi Arabia

- كلية الأمير محمد بن سلمان للإدارة وريادة الأعمال
- Former names: Prince Mohammad Bin Salman College of Business and Entrepreneurship (2016 - 2022)
- Type: College
- Established: June 17, 2016; 10 years ago
- Affiliations: MiSK Foundation, AMBA, AACSB, EFMD
- Academic affiliations: Babson College
- Dean: Dr. Zeger Degraeve
- Location: 4732 Juman Street, BaylaSun District, Unit No. 10., King Abdullah Economic City 23965-2609, Makkah Region, Saudi Arabia
- Website: www.mbsc.edu.sa

Prince Mohammed Bin Salman College of Business and Entrepreneurship (MBSC) (Arabic: كلية الأمير محمد بن سلمان للإدارة وريادة الأعمال) is a co-ed higher education business administration college in King Abdullah Economic City, Saudi Arabia. Established in 2016, it is the first college in Saudi Arabia which offers postgraduate degree as well as executive education. The college was named after its founder, Mohammed bin Salman, the Deputy Crown Prince of Saudi Arabia from 2015 to 2017 and later Crown Prince of Saudi Arabia since 2017.

== Establishment ==
The college was inaugurated on 17 June 2016 and the inauguration was attended by the then Deputy Crown Prince Mohammed Bin Salman himself.

The agreement for the establishment of MBSC was signed in Washington, D.C. by Badr Al-Asaker, secretary-general of the Mohammed Bin Salman Foundation (MISK); Fahd Al-Rasheed, group CEO and MD of KAEC and vice president of the board of trustees of the college; and Kerry Healey, president of Babson College.

Prince Mohammed Bin Salman College of Business and Entrepreneurship was established through an international partnership between Emaar The Economic City, Babson Global (a wholly owned subsidiary of Babson College, US), Lockheed Martin under the umbrella of the Economic Offset Program in Saudi Arabia and the MiSK Foundation.

== Partnership ==
Prince Mohammed Bin Salman College (MBSC) of Business & Entrepreneurship was launched as a new private, higher education institution for both men and women. It was established through an international partnership between Emaar The Economic City, Babson Global (a wholly owned subsidiary of Babson College, USA), Lockheed Martin under the umbrella of the Economic Offset Program in the Kingdom of Saudi Arabia and the MISK foundation.

=== MoU with Saudi Commission for Health Specialities ===
In November 2020, MBSC signed a memorandum of understanding with the Saudi Commission for Health Specialties, a scientific commission under the Ministry of Health to promote and enhance professional practice of health leadership and a step towards improving Saudi Arabia's health care sector.

== Graduation of the first batch ==
The college graduated the first batch of 93 MBA students in May 2019

== See also ==
- List of universities and colleges in Saudi Arabia
