= Riyadh Elm University =

Private university in Riyadh, Saudi Arabia

- جامعة رياض العلم
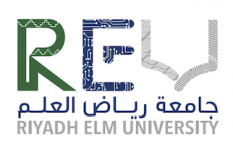
- Former names: Riyadh Colleges of Dentistry and Pharmacy (2009–2018) Riyadh College of Dentistry and Pharmacy (2004–2009)
- Established: 2004; 22 years ago
- Academic affiliations: King Saud University
- Location: Riyadh, Saudi Arabia
- Website: www.riyadh.edu.sa

Riyadh Elm University (REU) (Arabic: جامعة رياض العلم), formerly Riyadh Colleges of Dentistry and Pharmacy (RCsDP) (Arabic: كليات الرياض لطب الأسنان والصيدلة), is a private university with its main campus in the al-Namudhajiyah neighborhood of Riyadh, Saudi Arabia, and satellite campuses in al-Olaya, Munesiyah and Qurtuba. Established in 2004, it is the first private health institution of Saudi Arabia and is affiliated to King Saud University. The college assumed its current name when it was granted university status in 2018.

REU offers a range of undergraduate and postgraduate programs in these fields, including Doctor of Dental Medicine (DMD), Bachelor of Pharmacy (BPharm), and Master of Science (MSc) in Dental Sciences and Pharmaceutical Sciences.

== History ==
REU (formerly RCsDP) was established in 2004. This was the first private educational institution in Saudi Arabia that offered post-secondary (college-level) courses. As of 2015 the rector of the college was Prof. Abdullah Al Shammery. In February 2015 he told in an interview that Saudi Arabia needed a "comprehensive cariology" in their country. The college was established in 2004.

== Courses ==
Currently this college offers both undergraduate and postgraduate courses. Some of the courses offered by the institutions are—

- Bachelor of Dental Surgery
- Bachelor of Bachelor of Doctor of Pharmacy (PharmD)
- Bachelor of Nursing
- Bachelor of Dental Assisting
- Bachelor of Dental Hygiene
- Bachelor of Dental Laboratory Technology
- Bachelor of Medical Laboratory Technology
- Bachelor of Science in Cyber Security Track
- Bachelor of Science in Healthcare Information Systems Track
- Bachelor of Health Services and Hospital Management
- Master of Science in Dentistry and Competency Certificate in Dental Specialties
- Master of Science in Clinical Pharmacy & Pharm. D.

== See also ==
- List of universities and colleges in Saudi Arabia
