= University of Hafr Albatin =

Coordinates: 28.2417°N 45.9475°E

University of Hafr Al Batin
- Established: 2014; 12 years ago
- Academic staff: 720
- Administrative staff: 544
- Students: 16,000
- Location: Hafar al-Batin, Saudi Arabia
- Language: English, Arabic
- Website: www.uohb.edu.sa

University of Hafr Al Batin, often referred to as UOHB, is a Saudi public university that located in Hafr Albatin city in the eastern province. It was founded in 2014 on the royal decree by King Abdullah on April 3, 2014.

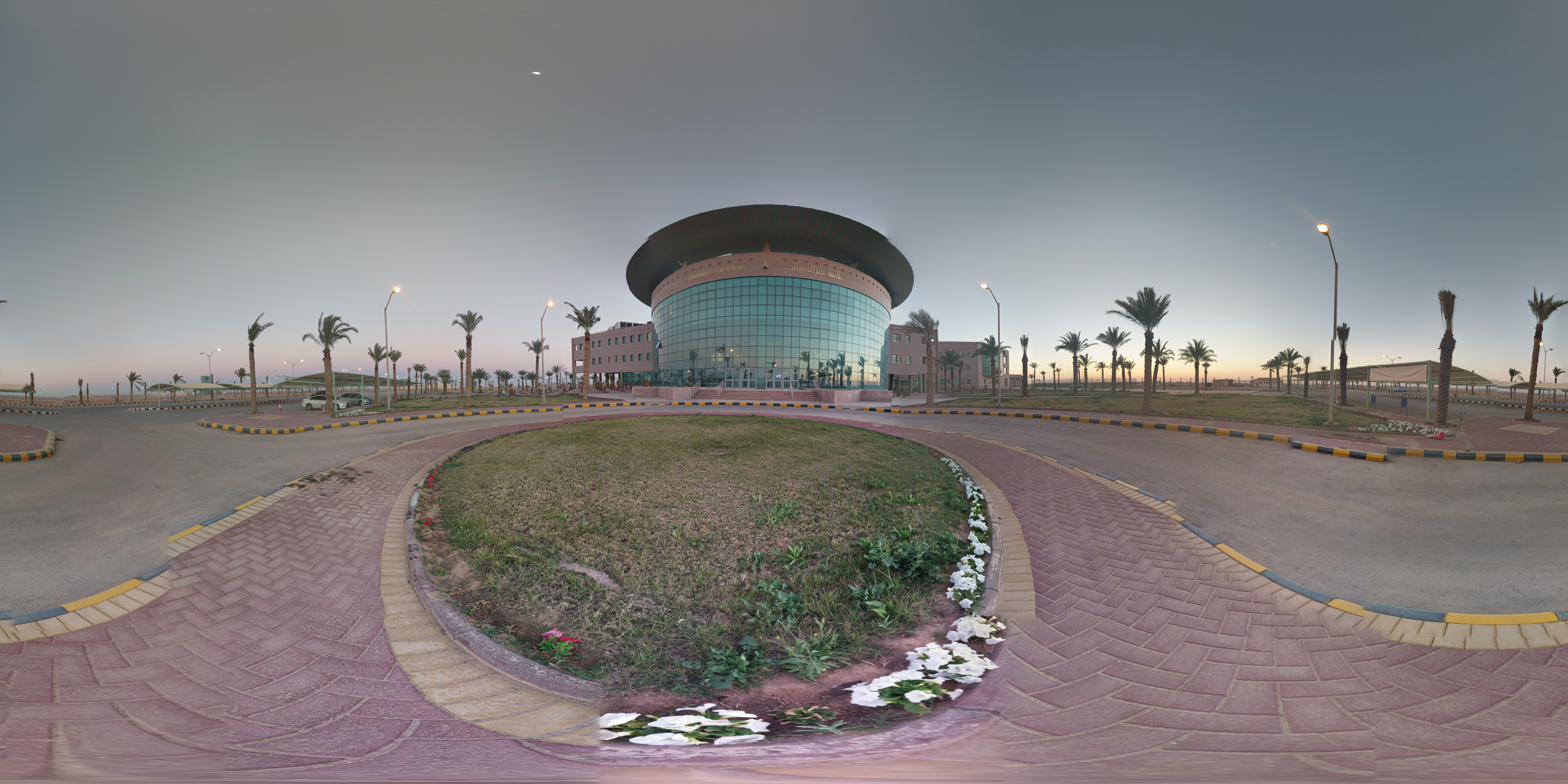
Panorama - University of Hafr Al Batin

== Colleges ==
UOHB has 10 colleges which are:

- College of Applied Medical Sciences
- College of Arts and Sciences – Al-Khafji
- College of Arts and Sciences – Nairiyah
- College of Arts and Sciences – Quaryah Oliya
- College of Business Administration
- College of Computer Science and Engineering
- College of Education
- College of Engineering
- College of Sciences and Supporting Studies
- Community College

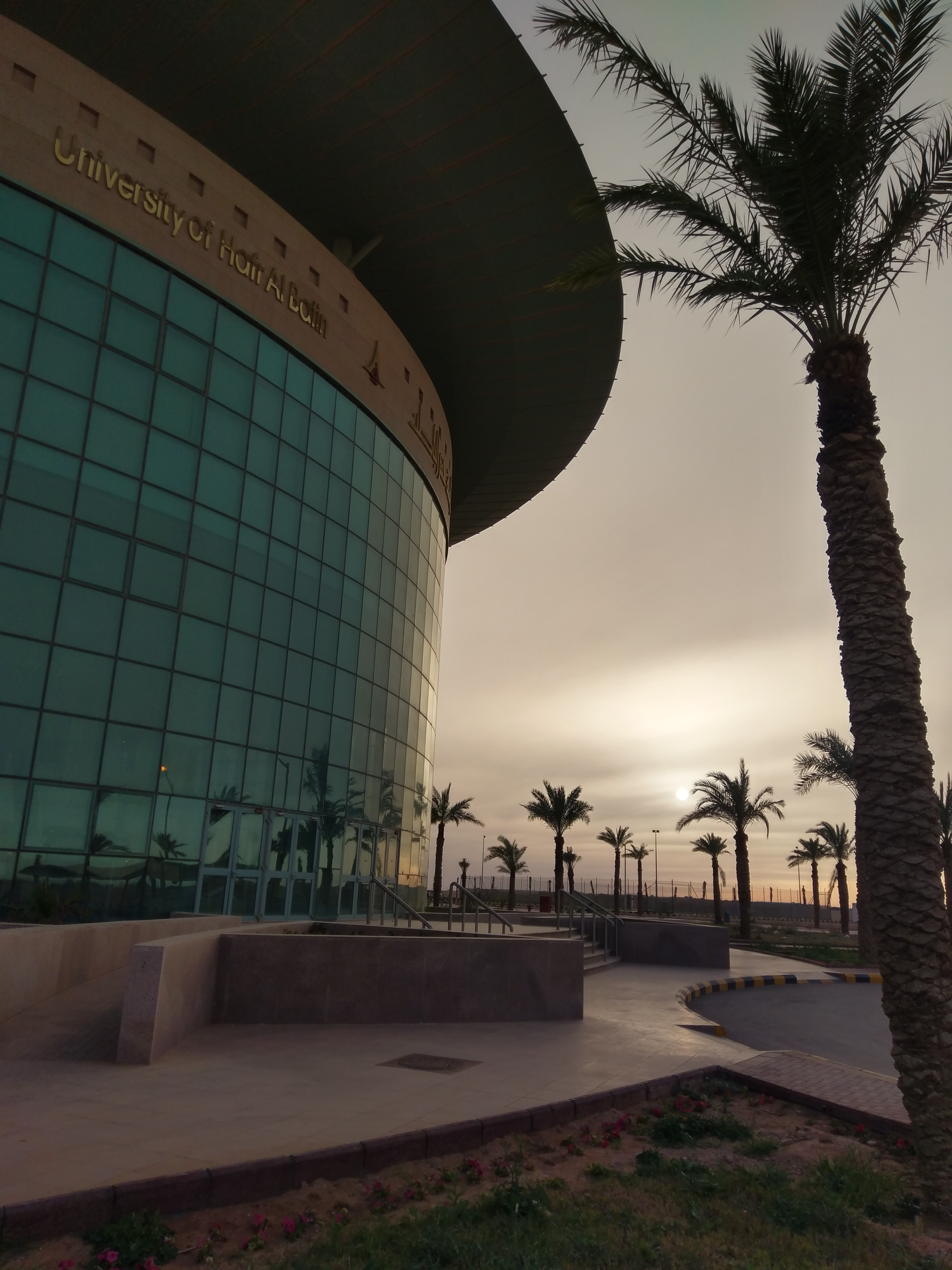
Main Entrance of University of Hafr Al Batin
