= Najran University =

Public university in Saudi Arabia

Coordinates: 17.6338°N 44.5322°E

- جامعة نجران
- Type: Public Research University
- Established: 2006; 20 years ago
- President: Falah bin Faraj bin Ali al-Subaie
- Location: Najran, Saudi Arabia
- Website: www.nu.edu.sa

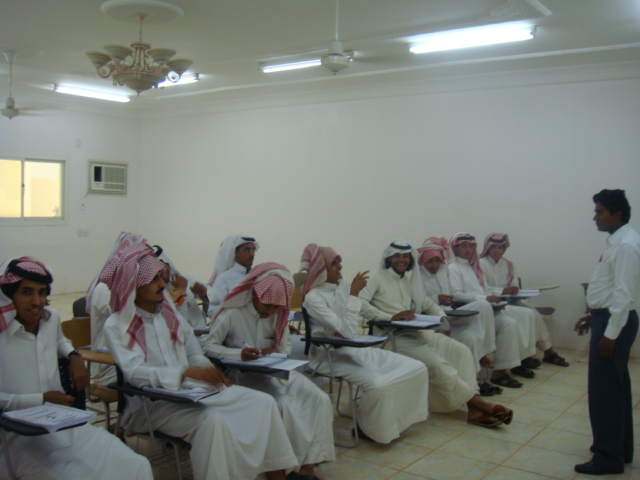
An instructor (far right) interacting with students in a class at Najran University

Najran University (Arabic: جامعة نجران) is a state-funded public research university located in Najran, Saudi Arabia. It was established in 2006 by a royal decree from King Abdullah bin Abdulaziz Al Saud.

The university offers undergraduate and graduate programs in various disciplines such as engineering, medicine, business, education, social sciences, and humanities.

== Beginnings ==
Najran University began as a community college of King Khalid University. On 11 November 2006, King Abdullah of Saudi Arabia issued the royal directive to convert the community college in Najran into an independent self-sustaining university.

== Academics ==
=== Colleges ===
The university currently includes fourteen colleges as follows:

- College of Applied Medical Sciences.
- College of Health Sciences.
- College of Pharmacy.
- College of Dentistry.
- College of Medicine.
- College of Computer Science & Information Systems.
- College of Education.
- College of Engineering.
- College of Administrative Sciences.
- College of Languages.
- College of Science and Arts.
- College of Sharia.
- College of Science and Arts of Sharoura.
- Community College.
- College of Pharmacy

== See also ==
- List of universities and colleges in Saudi Arabia
