= University of Hail =

Public university in Hail, Saudi Arabia, established in 2005

- جامعة حائل
- Type: Public
- Established: 2005
- President: Badr bin Shujaa Al-Amri Al-Harbi
- Location: Hail, Saudi Arabia; 27.673796°N 41.711332°E
- Website: UOH

University of Hail (Arabic: جامعة حائل) is a public university located in Hail City, Saudi Arabia. It was established in 2005 by royal decree as part of the expansion of public higher education institutions in the Kingdom of Saudi Arabia. The university offers undergraduate and postgraduate programs across medical, scientific, engineering, administrative, and humanities disciplines, and operates under the supervision of the Saudi Ministry of Education.

== History ==
The University of Hail was established in 2005 following a royal decree aimed at increasing access to higher education in regional areas of Saudi Arabia. Since its establishment, the university has expanded its academic offerings and institutional infrastructure to support teaching and research activities serving the Hail Region and neighboring areas. The university operates as part of the public higher education system regulated by the Saudi Ministry of Education

== Campus ==
The University of Hail operates a main campus in Hail City that includes academic colleges, research facilities, administrative offices, and student support services. The campus supports teaching, scientific research, and community engagement activities for students from the Hail Region and surrounding areas.

== Administration ==
The university is administered by a president appointed by royal order. The president oversees academic, administrative, and strategic operations in accordance with national higher education policies and regulations issued by the Saudi Ministry of Education.

== Presidents of the University ==
Presidents
No.	President	Term	Notes
1	Ahmed bin Mohammed Al-Saif Al-Subaie	2007 – May 2011	
2	Khalil bin Ibrahim Al-Muaiqil Al-Brahim Al-Shammari	July 2011 – 2021	
3	Rashid bin Muslat Al-Sharif	August 2021 – July 2024	
4	Zaid bin Muhalhal Al-Shammari	July 2024 – September 2025	Acting President
5	Badr bin Shujaa Al-Amri Al-Harbi	September 2025 – Present	

== Academic programs ==
The University of Hail offers undergraduate and postgraduate academic programs across multiple disciplines, including medicine, dentistry, pharmacy, applied medical sciences, engineering, computer science, business administration, education, arts and humanities, and law. Academic programs are developed in alignment with national higher education standards and labor market needs in Saudi Arabia.

=== Preparatory Year Program ===
Newly admitted students are enrolled in a Preparatory Year Program designed to develop foundational academic skills and English -language proficiency required for entry into specialized academic tracks.

=== Bridging Program ===
The Bridging Program provides diploma holders with structured pathways to continue their education through parallel study programs in selected disciplines, in accordance with national higher education regulations.

=== Colleges ===
The university comprises several academic colleges offering undergraduate and postgraduate programs across medical, scientific, engineering, administrative, educational, and humanities disciplines.

=== Colleges ===
The University of Hail comprises several academic colleges offering undergraduate and postgraduate programs across medical, scientific, engineering, administrative, educational, and humanities disciplines.

- College of Sharia and Law
- College of Medicine
- College of Dentistry
- College of Pharmacy
- College of Applied Medical Sciences
- College of Nursing
- College of Public Health Sciences
- College of Engineering
- College of Computer Science and Engineering
- College of Science
- Applied College
- College of Education
- College of Arts and Humanities
- College of Business Administration

=== Academic disciplines ===
The University of Hail comprises several academic colleges offering undergraduate and postgraduate programs across medical, scientific, engineering, administrative, educational, and humanities disciplines.

- College of Sharia and Law
  - Sharia
  - Law
- College of Medicine
  - Medicine
- College of Dentistry
  - Dentistry
- College of Pharmacy
  - Pharmacy
- College of Applied Medical Sciences
  - Diagnostic Radiology
  - Physical Therapy
  - Clinical Nutrition
  - Clinical Laboratories
- College of Nursing
  - Nursing
- College of Public Health Sciences
  - Public Health
  - Health Informatics
  - Health Administration
  - Environmental Health
- College of Engineering
  - Civil Engineering
  - Electrical Engineering
  - Mechanical Engineering
  - Chemical Engineering
  - Industrial Engineering
  - Architectural Engineering
  - Renewable Energy Engineering
  - Interior Design and Decoration
- College of Computer Science and Engineering
  - Computer Science
  - Software Engineering
  - Computer Engineering
  - Data Science
  - Artificial Intelligence
  - Network and Communications Engineering
  - Information Security
- College of Science
  - Physics
  - Chemistry
  - Microbiology
  - Mathematics
- Applied College
  - Business Administration
  - Electronics and Instrumentation Engineering
  - Computer Systems
- College of Education
  - Islamic Culture
  - Special Education
  - Psychology
  - Home Economics
  - Kindergarten
  - Primary Education
- College of Arts and Humanities
  - Tourism and Archaeology
  - Arabic Language
  - English Language
  - Social Sciences
  - Geographic Information Systems
  - Media
- College of Business Administration
  - Management and Information Systems
  - Accounting
  - Economics and Finance

== Research ==
Research and graduate studies at the University of Hail are overseen by the Vice Presidency for Graduate Studies and Scientific Research. The university conducts applied and academic research across various disciplines and has been included in international institutional and research rankings, reflecting its research output and academic development within the Saudi higher education sector.

== Accreditation ==
The University of Hail operates under the regulatory and quality assurance framework of the Saudi Ministry of Education applicable to public universities in the Kingdom of Saudi Arabia.

== Social Media ==
- X
- Youtube
- Snapchat
- Tiktok

== See also ==
- Education in Saudi Arabia
