= Al Jouf University =

University in Saudi Arabia

Jouf University
- جامعة الجوف
- Established: 2005; 21 years ago
- Location: Sakakah, Al Jawf, Saudi Arabia; 29.7907°N 40.0450°E
- Website: www.ju.edu.sa

Jouf University is located in Al-Jawf, Saudi Arabia. It was founded in 2005 by royal decree. It is currently the only university serving the Al-Jouf Region.

== Colleges and Faculties ==
Al-Jouf University contains ten colleges on its main campus in Sakaka and a number of other colleges on various sub-campuses, some of them being former separate community colleges. These include:

1. The Faculty of Education
2. The Faculty of Pharmacy
3. The Faculty of Science
4. The Faculty of Applied Natural Sciences
5. The Faculty of Dentistry
6. The Faculty of Sharee'ah and Law
7. The Faculty of Medicine
8. The Faculty of Humanitarian and Administrative Sciences
9. The Faculty of Applied Medical Sciences (Qariyaat campus)
10. The Applied College of Sakaka
11. The Faculty of Engineering
12. The Faculty of Computer and Information Sciences

=== Community Colleges ===
Al-Jouf University took the initiative to establish the Applied College to align its programs with the needs of the labor market, inspired by the Kingdom's Vision 2030, which establishes the principles of building human capabilities, which are the backbone of sustainable development and a prosperous economy in a vibrant and ambitious homeland. Accordingly, the administrative decision No. 2244/42/6 was issued by His Excellency the President of Al-Jouf University - may God protect him - dated 10/27/1442 AH, which stipulates the conversion of the Community College in Sakaka, the Community College in Qurayyah, and the Community College in Tabarjal into a college called (Applied College), based on the decision of the Council of University Affairs No. 9/4/1442 dated 9/14/1442 AH, which stipulates the approval of the conversion of community colleges, colleges of applied studies, and colleges of community service in universities to become applied colleges; In accordance with Vision 2030, which aims for comprehensive economic renaissance.

It is expected that there will be a large number of jobs suitable for Saudi youth, in addition to supporting strategic partnerships between Al-Jouf University on the one hand and business sectors and companies on the other hand.

Admission to the diploma programs of the Applied College for high school graduates was opened on Monday 11/25/1442 AH; to meet the needs of the labor market and future professions of professional and applied specializations according to the Kingdom's Vision 2030, in the Information Technology and Financial Management programs according to the following tracks:

First: Information Technology Program Tracks:

Diploma in Information Technology Management.

Diploma in Multimedia and Internet Technologies.

Diploma in Networks and Cybersecurity.

Diploma in Artificial Intelligence Applications.

Second: Financial Management Program Tracks:

Diploma in Financial and Banking Management.

Diploma in Corporate Finance.

At the main center of the Applied College and its branches (Sakaka, Al-Qurayyat, and Tabarjal).

== Ranking ==
Jouf University has earned its place in international university rankings in recent years. The university is ranked #40 in QS Arab Region Ranking for 2025. The QS World University Rankings ranked the university 901-950 in World for 2026.

University rankings

Global – Overall
- QS World: 901-950 (2026)

== See also ==
- List of universities and colleges in Saudi Arabia
