= Majmaah University =

Saudi Arabian university

Coordinates: 25°52′11″N 45°24′42″E

- جامعة المجمعة
- Type: Public University
- Established: 2009; 17 years ago
- President: Khaled bin Saad Al-Muqrin
- Location: Al Majma'ah, Riyadh, Saudi Arabia
- Campus: Urban
- Website: www.mu.edu.sa

Majmaah University (Arabic: جامعة المجمعة) is a public university located in Al Majma'ah, Riyadh Province, Saudi Arabia. It was established in 2009 by royal decree during the expansion of public higher education in the Kingdom. The university serves the governorates of Al Majma'ah, Al Zulfi, Al Ghat, Rumah, and Hotat Sudair through a multi-campus system, offering undergraduate and postgraduate programs in a wide range of academic disciplines.

== History ==
Majmaah University was established on 24 August 2009 (3 Ramadan 1430 AH) by royal decree as one of four public universities founded simultaneously to expand access to higher education in Saudi Arabia. Since its establishment, the university has developed academic programs, research centers, and community service initiatives while expanding its educational services across several governorates in Riyadh Province.

== Campus ==
The university's main campus is located in the southern part of Al Majma'ah, approximately **180 kilometres northwest of Riyadh. The university city occupies an area of more than six million square metres and includes academic colleges, administrative buildings, research laboratories, libraries, student housing, sports facilities, medical services, and supporting infrastructure. The campus is visible from the Riyadh–Qassim highway and is considered one of the city's prominent landmarks.

In addition to the main campus, the university operates branch campuses in Al Zulfi, Al Ghat, Rumah, and Hotat Sudair, providing higher education opportunities throughout the region.

== Academic organization ==
Majmaah University comprises colleges in medicine, dentistry, engineering, computer and information sciences, business administration, science, education, applied medical sciences, nursing, and other disciplines. The university offers bachelor's, master's, and doctoral programs, together with continuing education and professional development initiatives.

== Research ==
The university supports research through specialized research centers, innovation programs, and collaborations with governmental and industrial partners. Its research activities cover engineering, health sciences, information technology, artificial intelligence, environmental sciences, and other scientific fields. The university also promotes innovation and entrepreneurship through dedicated research and innovation centers.

== Governance ==
Majmaah University operates under the supervision of the Ministry of Education of Saudi Arabia. The university is headed by a president and is governed in accordance with the regulations applicable to Saudi public universities.

== See also ==
- List of universities and colleges in Saudi Arabia
