= University of Tabuk =

Public university in Tabuk, Saudi Arabia

Coordinates: 28°23′4″N 36°28′52″E

- جامعة تبوك
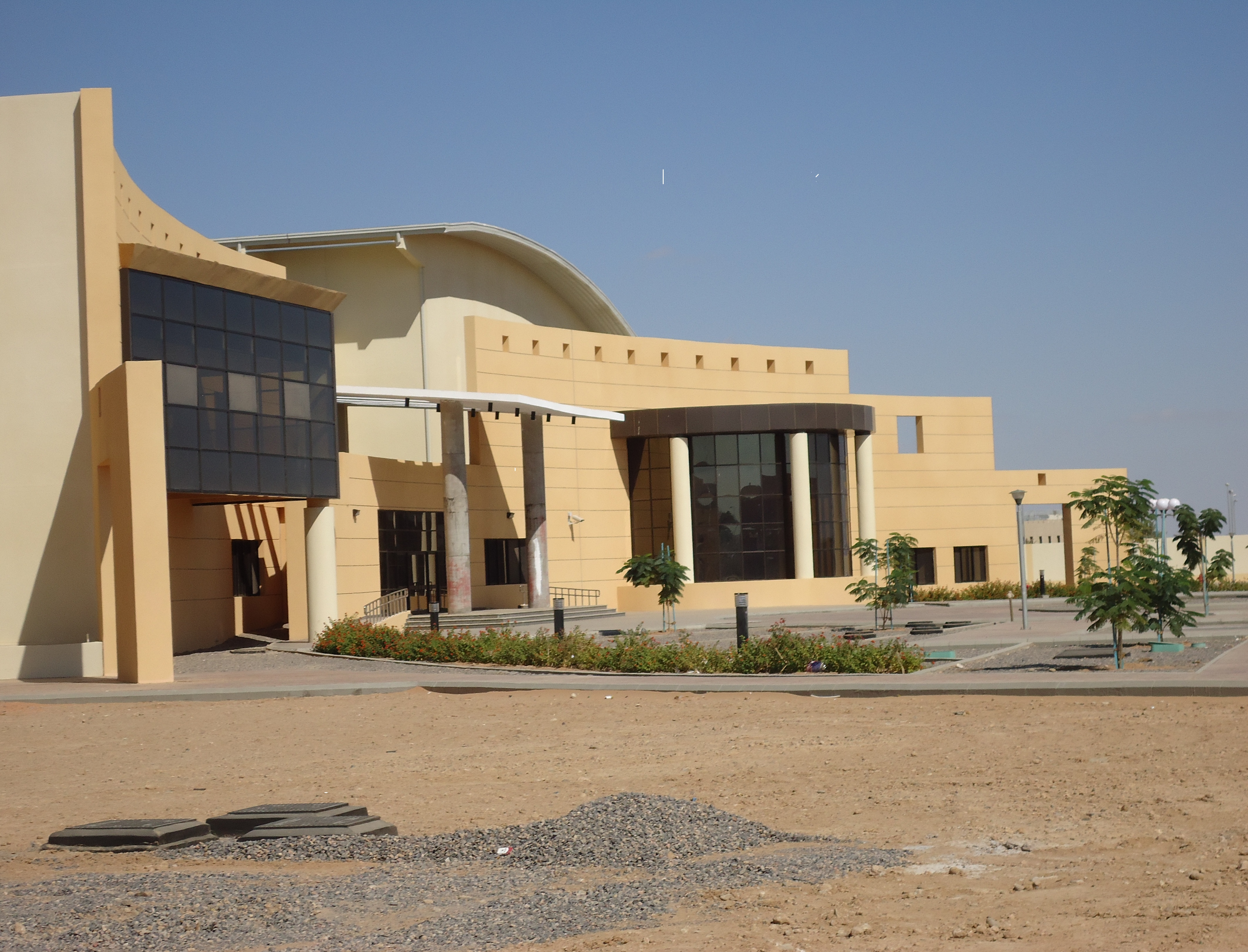
- Type: Public
- Established: 2006; 20 years ago
- Faculty: 1,997
- Students: 29,407
- Location: P.O. Box 741, Tabuk, Tabuk, Tabuk Province, Saudi Arabia
- Campus: Tabuk (main campus), Duba, Al Wajh, Umluj, Haql, Tayma
- Colors: Green, Gold
- Nicknames: UTabuk, UT, UniTab
- Website: www.ut.edu.sa

The University of Tabuk is a public university located in Tabuk, Saudi Arabia. It was founded in 2006.

The University of Tabuk is home to a number of research centers and institutes, including the Prince Fahd Bin Sultan Research Chair for Renewable Energy, the King Abdullah Bin Abdulaziz Chair for Research and Studies in Entrepreneurship, and the Center for Environmental Studies.

The university offers a variety of undergraduate and graduate programs in various disciplines such as engineering, computer science, health sciences, natural sciences, business administration, tourism and hospitality, law, and education. The university currently consists of 18 colleges across its campuses.

== Campus ==
The main campus is located in University City on Duba Road in the city of Tabuk, northwestern Saudi Arabia. The campus comprises academic buildings, research laboratories, libraries, student housing, sports facilities, and administrative offices. It also includes digital learning infrastructure and research facilities that support teaching and scientific research.

The Tabuk University Mosque is one of the university's most prominent landmarks. Opened in 2020, the mosque features a large column-free dome that combines traditional Islamic architectural elements with modern engineering design. It has been described as one of the notable architectural landmarks in the Tabuk region.

The university is located in Tabuk Province, which is also home to the NEOM megaproject. Its location has positioned the university to contribute to education, research, and workforce development initiatives associated with the region's economic and technological developmen

== See also ==
- List of universities and colleges in Saudi Arabia
