= Ibn Sina National College for Medical Studies =

Coordinates: 21°26′47″N 39°12′29″E

- كلية ابن سينا الأهلية للعلوم الطبية
- Motto: التميز في التعليم الطبي
- Type: Private
- Established: 2004; 22 years ago
- President: Sheikh Shaly El Jedaani
- Dean: Rashad Hassan Kashgari
- Director: Shabbir Ahmed Sayeed
- Location: Jeddah, Makkah, Saudi Arabia

Ibn Sina National College for Medical Studies (Arabic: كلية ابن سينا الأهلية للعلوم الطبية) is the first private medical college of higher education under the supervision of the Ministry of Higher Education, Kingdom of Saudi Arabia. The college is promoted by Al-Jedani Group of Hospitals, KSA. It is located in the southern part of the historic city Jeddah, on the Red Sea coast.

INCMS is accredited by the Saudi Ministry of Education and the Saudi Commission for Health Specialties. It is also recognized by the World Health Organization and the International Medical Education Directory.

The college offers a variety of undergraduate and postgraduate programs in medicine, nursing, and clinical pharmacy.

== See also ==
- List of universities and colleges in Saudi Arabia
