= University for Business and Technology =

Private university in Kosovo

Coordinates: 42.6475°N 21.1528°E

UBT
- UBT
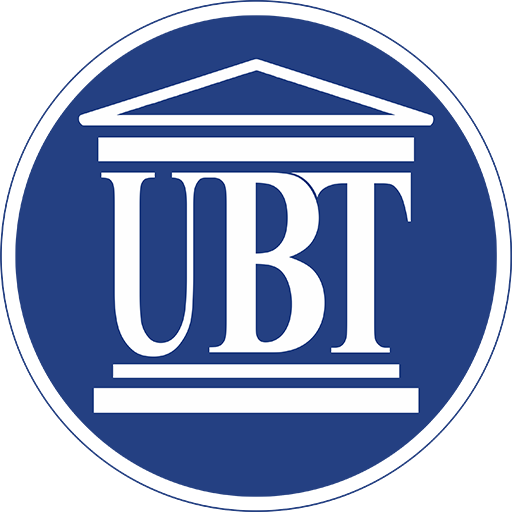
- Type: Private
- Established: 2001
- Rector: Edmond Hajrizi
- Academic staff: 300-500
- Students: 10000
- Location: Pristina, 10000, Kosovo
- Campus: Lipljan, Ferizaj & Prizren
- Colours
- Website: www.ubt-uni.net

University for Business and Technology (UBT) is a private university located in Kosovo.

== Campus ==
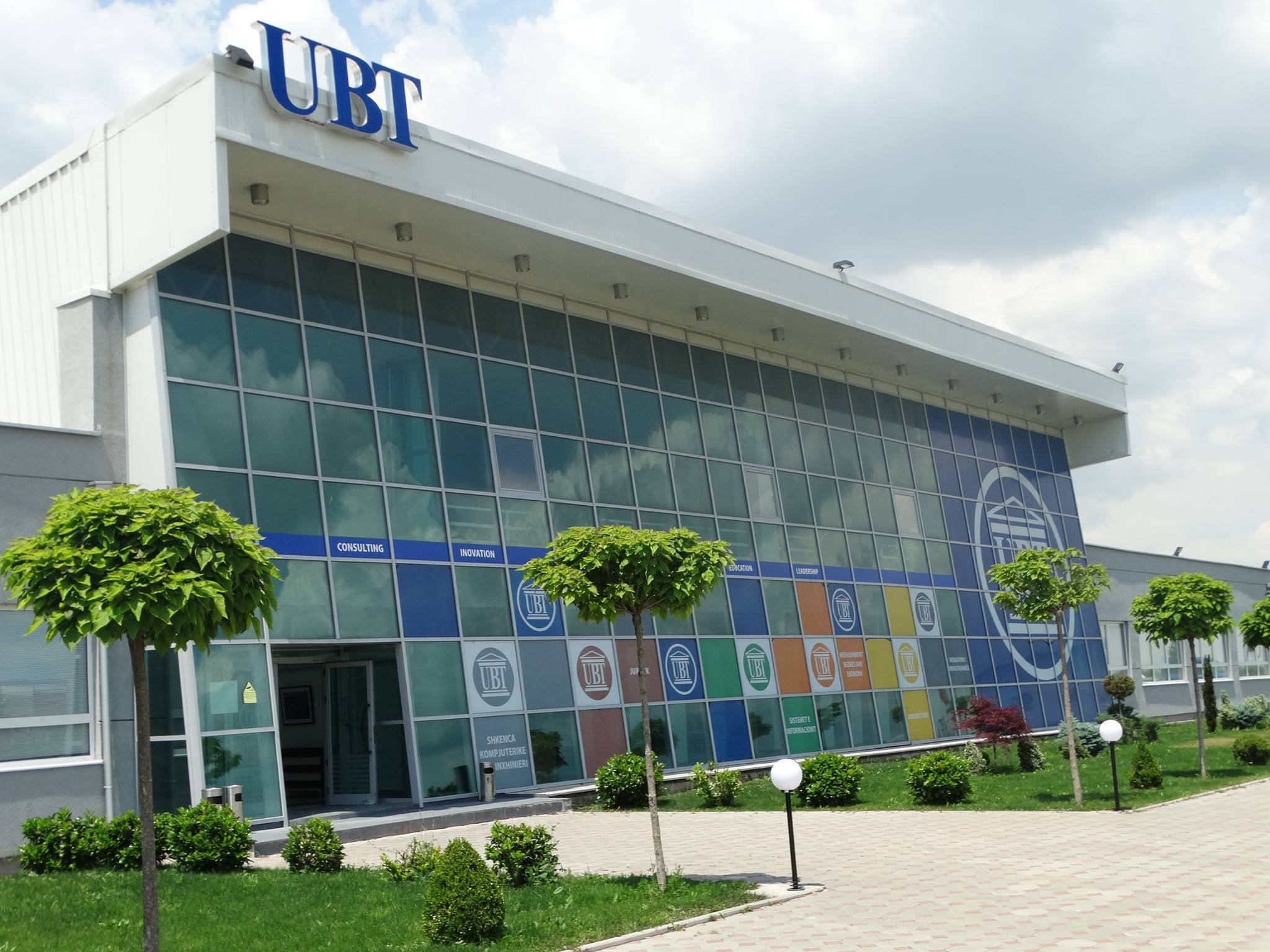
UBT Campus 1

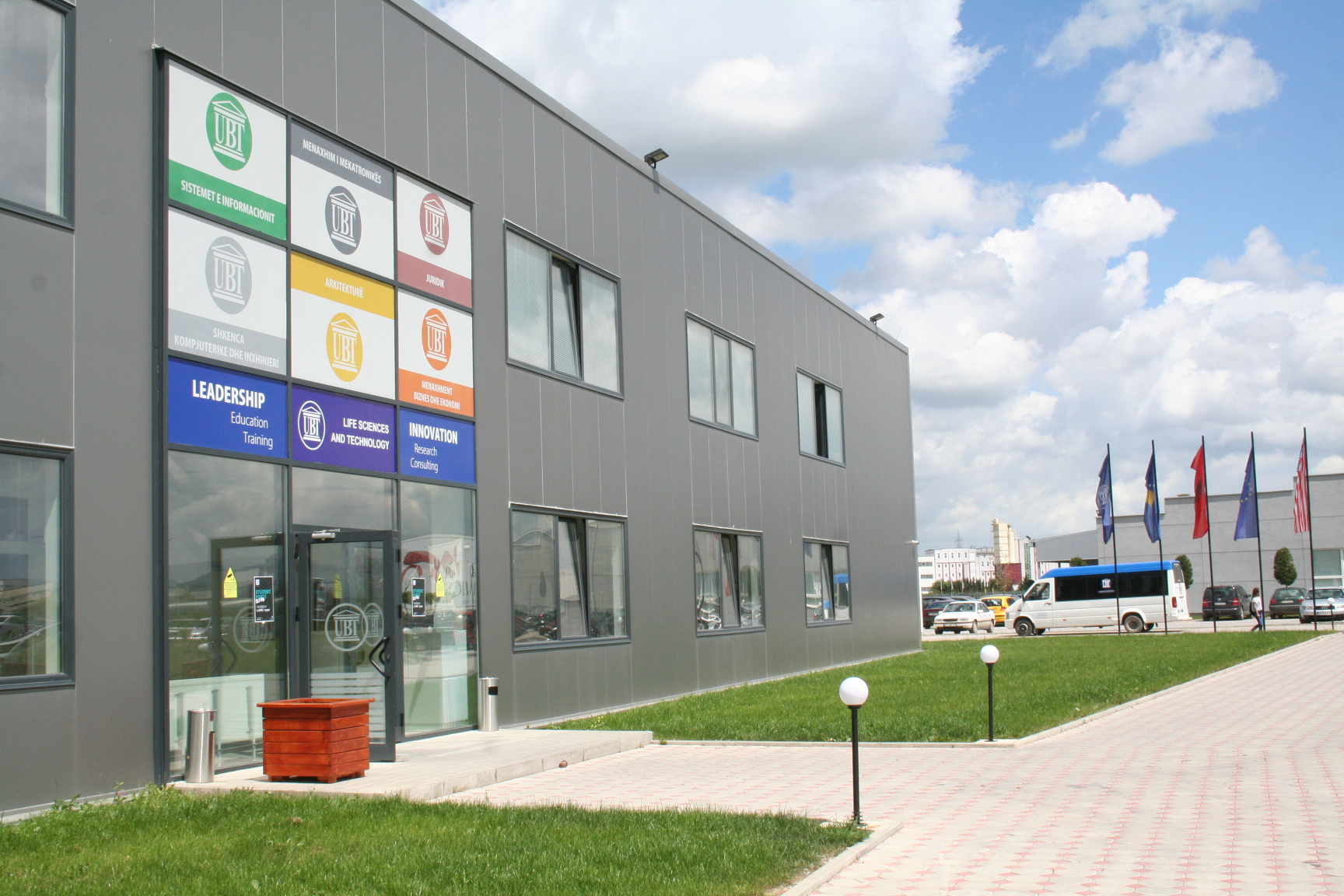
UBT Campus 2

== Courses ==
UBT provides a study environment for Bachelor and Master students through problem based learning. The education offered at UBT includes lectures in foreign languages delivered by lecturers and scholars from abroad, providing opportunities for both domestic and international students to study in a multicultural environment. With over 50 fields of study available, students can select a field of specialization according to their academic and professional interests.

The university offers both undergraduate and post-graduate courses. The following study programs are accredited at UBT:

- Management, Business and Economics (Bachelor's and Master's)
  - Finance, Banking and Insurance
  - Accounting, Audit and Taxation
  - Marketing and Sales
  - Management, Entrepreneurship and Innovation
  - Logistics and Procurement Management
  - International Business
- Computer Science and Engineering (Bachelor's and Master's)
  - Software and Engineering Systems
  - Database and Information Systems
  - Network and Telecommunications
  - Mechatronics and Robotics
  - Design and Multimedia
- Mechatronics Management (Bachelor's and Master's)
  - Electrotechnics
  - Electronics
  - Information Technology
  - Industrial Production
  - Industrial Design
- Information Systems (Bachelor's and Master's)
  - Business Information Systems
  - Geo Information Systems (GIS)
  - Library Information Systems and Knowledge Management
  - Statistics, Data Processing and Simulation
  - Information Security and Privacy
- Architecture and Spatial Planning (Bachelor's and Master's)
  - Architecture
  - Design
  - Spatial Planning
  - Energy and Environment
- Building and Infrastructure Engineering (Bachelor's)
  - Infrastructure
  - Environment
  - Management
  - Construction
- Political Science and Diplomacy (Bachelor's)
  - International Relations and Diplomacy
  - European Integration
  - Public Administration
- Law (Bachelor's and Master's)
  - Civil Law
  - Criminal Law
  - International Law
  - International and European Business Law
- Media and Communication (Bachelor's)
  - Journalism
  - Communication
  - Media Management
  - Public Relations
  - Online Journalism
  - Camera and Photography
- Energy Engineering (Bachelor's and Professional Diploma)
  - Energy Efficiency Engineering (only accredited institution in Kosovo)
  - Energy Economy
  - Sustainable Design
  - Electric Generation and Renewable Energy
  - Energy Management
  - Biomass Energy and Environment
- Nursing (Bachelor's)
  - General Emergency Nursing
  - Internal Medicine Nursing
  - Surgical Nursing
  - Community and Family Nursing
  - Mental Health Nursing
  - Oncology Nursing
  - Obstetrical Nursing
  - Pediatric Nursing
- Integrated Design (Bachelor's)
  - Graphic and Communication Design
  - Fashion and Textile Design
  - Industrial Product Design
  - Building and Furniture Design
- Food Science and Technology (Bachelor's)
  - Food Technology
  - Nutrition
  - Food Quality and Safety Management
- Public Policy and Management (Master's)
