= Northern Borders University =

University in Saudi Arabia

Northern Border University
- جامعة الحدود الشمالية
- Type: Public university
- Established: 2007; 19 years ago
- Affiliations: Association of Arab Universities
- Rector: Prof. Ahmed bin Ali Al-Rumaih
- Location: Arar, Northern Borders Province, Saudi Arabia; 30.9159°N 41.0793°E
- Website: www.nbu.edu.sa

Northern Border University (NBU) is located in Arar, Saudi Arabia. It was founded in 2007. It contains 16 colleges: nine in Arar, four in Rafha, two in Turayf, and one in Al-Uwayqilah. It offers a variety of majors across multiple levels, including bachelor's and master's degree programs in fields such as business, computer science, engineering, education, law, medicine, pharmacy, and sciences.

(NBU) University has partnerships and collaborations with various international universities and institutions, including the University of Nebraska-Lincoln in the United States, the University of Stavanger in Norway, and the University of Strathclyde in the United Kingdom.

== See also ==
- List of universities and colleges in Saudi Arabia
