= Prince Sattam bin Abdulaziz University =

Public university in Saudi Arabia

Prince Sattam Bin Abdulaziz University (جامعة الأمير سطام بن عبدالعزيز) Jāmaat sattam bin abdulaziz
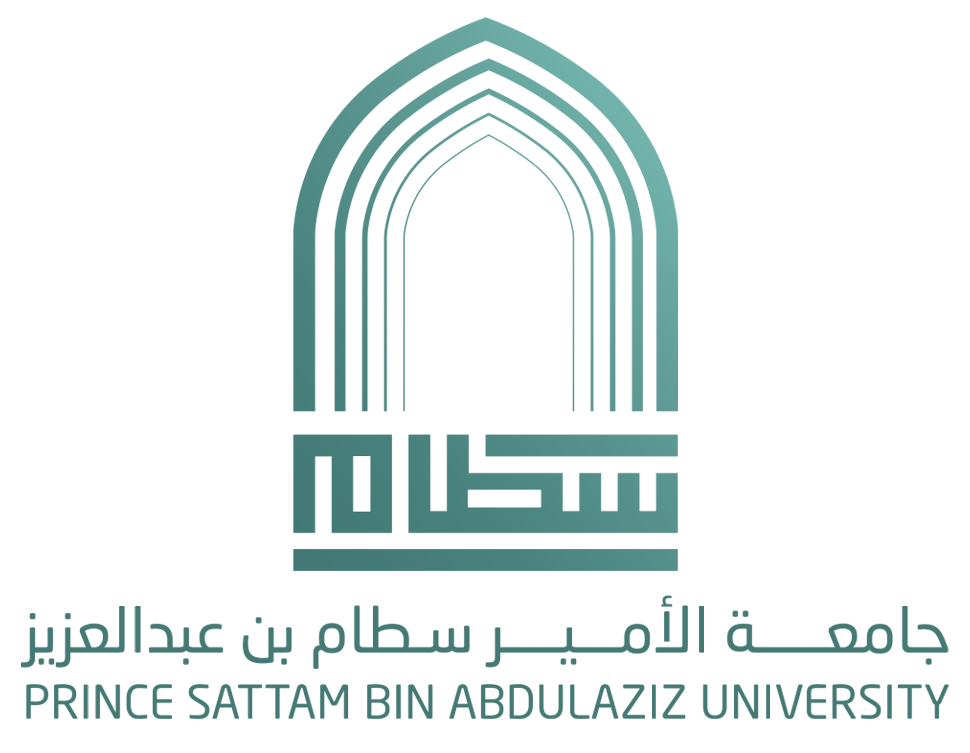
- Type: Public
- Established: 2009; 17 years ago
- Faculty: 2,000+
- Students: 30,000+
- Location: Al Kharj, Saudi Arabia; 24.147°N 47.272°E
- Website: psau.edu.sa

Prince Sattam Bin Abdulaziz University, formerly known as Prince Salman Bin Abdulaziz University, also known as the University of Al-Kharj, is a public university located in the city of Al-Kharj, Saudi Arabia. It is under the supervision of the Ministry of Higher Education Saudi Arabia and managed by the Rector of the University, Dr. Abdulaziz Abdullah Alhamid.

The university offers a range of undergraduate, graduate, and postgraduate programs in various fields, including humanities, social sciences, engineering, business, medicine, and health sciences. In addition to academic programs, PSAU also offers a range of extracurricular activities, including sports, cultural events, and community service initiatives.

== History ==
The university was established by royal decree in 2007 to transfer a branch of King Saud University in Al-Kharj to the independent university called the University of Al-Kharj, and the accession of all colleges in the saih, Dalam, Wadi dawaser, Hawtat Bani Tamim, Aflaj, and Alhareeq. On 23/10/1432 (Muslim calendar) the name of the university was modified by a royal decree to the University of Prince Salman bin Abdulaziz. Since the beginning of 1436-2015 its name has become Prince Sattam bin Abdulaziz University (PSAU).

=== Former Rectors ===
- Dr. Abdulrahman Mohammed Alasimi (2009 to 2017).
- Dr. Abdulaziz Abdullah Alhamid, (2017 until 2021).
- Dr. Abdulrahman H. Altalhi (2021 until now).

== Administration ==
=== Top management ===
- Rector Office

=== Vice rectories ===
- Vice-Rectorate
- Vice-Rectorate of Female Students Affairs
- Vice-Rectorate of Education and Academic Affairs
- Vice-Rectorate of Development and Quality
- Vice-Rectorate of Postgraduate Studies and Scientific Research
- Vice-Rectorate of Branches

=== Deanships ===
- Deanship of Preparatory Year
- Deanship of Scientific Research
- Deanship of Development and Quality
- Deanship of Postgraduate Studies
- Deanship of Admission and Registration
- Deanship of Human Resources
- Deanship of Student Affairs
- Deanship of IT and Distance Learning
- Deanship of Library Affairs
- Deanship of Community Service and Continuing Education

== Campuses and Academics ==
PSAU main campus is located in Al Kharj. Other campuses are located on Wadi Addawasir, Hotat Bani Tamim, Aflaj, and Slayel.

Colleges located in Al Kharj are:

- College of Medicine

The college contains these departments: Basic Medical Departments, Department of Pediatrics, Department of Internal Medicine, Department of Surgery, and Department of Gynecology and Obstetrics

- College of Pharmacy
  - Department of Pharmaceutics
  - Department of Pharmacology
  - Department of Clinical Pharmacy
  - Department of Pharmacognosy
  - Department of Pharmaceutical Chemistry
- College of Dentistry
  - Department of Teeth Reformation
  - Department of Oral and Maxillofacial Surgery and Diagnostic Sciences
  - Department of Prosthetic Dental Sciences
  - Department of Preventive Dental
- College of Applied Medical Sciences
  - Department of Physical Therapy & Health Rehabilitation
  - Department of Radiology and Medical Imaging
  - Department of Nursing
  - Department of Medical Laboratory Sciences
  - Department of Biomedical Equipment Technology
- College of Education
  - Department of Arabic Language
  - Department of Islamic Studies
  - Kindergarten Department
  - Department of Curriculum and Instruction
  - Department of Educational Sciences
  - Department of Psychology
  - Department of Special Education
- College of Computer Engineering and Sciences
  - Department of Computer Engineering
  - Department of Software Engineering
  - Department of Computer Science
  - Department of Information System
- College of Business Administration
  - Management Department
  - Marketing Department
  - Finance Department
  - Accounting Department
  - Human Resources Department
  - Management Information Systems Department
- College of Sciences and Humanities
  - Department of Mathematics
  - Department of Physics
  - Department of English
  - Department of Law
  - Department of Chemistry
  - Department of Biology
- College of Engineering
  - Department of Civil Engineering
  - Department of Mechanical Engineering
  - Department of Electrical Engineering
  - Department of Industrial Engineering
- Community College
  - Department of Computing
  - Department of English Language
  - Department of Business Administration
- College of Engineering - Wadi Addawasir
  - Department of Electrical Engineering
  - Department of Mechanical Engineering
  - Department of Computer Engineering
- College of Applied Medical Sciences - Wadi Addawasir
  - Department of Medical Devices
  - Department of Health Rehabilitation
  - Department of Emergency Medical Services
  - Department of Radiological Sciences
  - Department of Medical Laboratory
  - Department of Community Health
  - Department of Nursing Science
- College of Education - Wadi Addawasir
  - Department of Special Education
  - Department of Home Economics
  - Department of Islamic Studies
  - Department of Educational Sciences
  - Department of English
  - Department of Arabic Language
  - Department of kindergarten
- College of Arts and Sciences - Wadi Addawasir
  - Department of Computer Science
  - Department of Mathematics
  - Department of English Language and Literature
  - Department of Arabic Language and Literature
- College of Business Administration at Hotat Bani Tamim
  - Department of Management Information Systems
  - Department of Accounting
- College of Sciences and Humanities - Hotat Bani Tamim
  - Department of Islamic Studies
  - Department of Mathematics
  - Department of Chemistry
  - Department of Arabic Language
  - English Department
  - IS Department
- College of Sciences and Humanities - Slayel
  - Department of English
  - Department of Arabic Language
  - Department of Mathematics
  - Department of Computer Science
  - Department of Business Administration
  - Department of Islamic Studies
- College of Sciences and Humanities- Aflaj
  - Department of Islamic Studies
  - Department of Business Administration
  - Department of Mathematics
  - Department of Physics
  - Department of Chemistry
  - Department of English
  - Department of Arabic Language
  - Department of Accounting
  - Department of Computer Science
- Community College- Aflaj
  - Department of Administrative Sciences and Humanities - Business Administration
  - Department of Administrative Sciences and Humanities - Sales Management
  - Department of Administrative Sciences and Humanities - English
  - Department of Applied Medical Sciences - Medical Devices
  - Department of Applied Medical Sciences - Nursing
  - Department of Applied Natural Sciences - Computer
  - Department of Applied Natural Sciences - Mathematics

== Institute of Research & Consulting Services ==
The Institute of Research and Consulting Services was founded upon the resolution of Higher Education Council No. (62) 5/12/2010. The resolution was approved by The Custodian of The Two Holy Mosques, the Prime Minister and the Chairman of the Higher Education Council directive dispatch No. 446/M/B Dated on 27/12/2010. Under which the Institute is entitled to conduct paid studies, provide consultancy, scientific, and research services for all government and civil sectors.

== University Hospital ==
The University Hospital includes all medical specialties and provides its services through 36 general and specialized clinics, in addition to male and female clinics in the colleges.

== University's Endowments ==
It is a program established by Prince Sattam bin Abdulaziz University, this program aims to enhance the role of the university in activating partnerships and community service and development, and to achieve self-sufficiency for the university's resources to be self-contained, as endowment incomes are spent on supporting activities and research and advancing scientific research and study centers that lead to improving the university level In international classifications and strengthening research and development efforts and education, support for university hospitals and health research to treat chronic diseases and conduct research beneficial to humanity, and activate the relationship between the university and society.

=== Endowments objectives ===
1. Funding scholarships for needy students and supporting the fields of righteousness, charity, and social and health solidarity in the university community and the governorates in it
2. Supporting research projects that address the governorates' problems and serve their development goals
3. Developing human resources at the university, and attracting distinguished scientific, administrative and investment capabilities
4. Supporting the long-term operational and production budget for future generations
5. Development of the university's own resources to stimulate creativity, innovation and performance excellence
6. Financing the infrastructure of the university’s educational process in all its specializations
7. Supporting the development programs, and stimulating creativity and talent among male and female students

== University Ranking ==
	National	Arabic	Asia	Global
QS stars	15	81-90	-	-
Webometrics	17	-	72	2982
URAP	12	-	647	1841
UniRANK	14	37	-	2680
SCImago	21	Best 60	110 (Middle East)	730

== Notable Persons ==
- Moustapha Eid Moustapha, PhD, Department of Chemistry
- Professor Dr. Usman Tariq (Computer Science and Engineering)
- Dr. Ismot Kabir, former clinical lecturer in medicine.
- Dr. Manjur Kolhar (Computer Science)
- Dr. Abdalla Alameen (Head of the Department, Computer Science)
- Professor Abdelmoneim Sulieman (Radiology and Medical Imaging Sciences)

== See also ==
- List of universities and colleges in Saudi Arabia
