= King Khalid University =

Public university in Abha, Saudi Arabia

- جامعة الملك خالد
- Type: Public university
- Established: 1998; 28 years ago
- President: Prof. Faleh bin Raja Allah Al-Solami
- Academic staff: 3,136
- Administrative staff: 2,126
- Students: 61,708
- Location: Abha, Asir Region, Saudi Arabia
- Campus: 27 campuses
- Website: www.kku.edu.sa/en

King Khalid University (KKU) is a public university headquartered in Abha, in the Asir Region of south-western Saudi Arabia. It was established in 1998 following the merger of the southern branches of Imam Muhammad ibn Saud Islamic University and King Saud University.

The university includes 26 accredited colleges distributed across 27 campuses, with 61,708 students, 3,136 faculty members, and 2,126 employees.

The university has also been featured in several international rankings.

== Establishment and history ==
The university was officially established on Tuesday, 6 May 1998 (9/1/1419 AH), during a visit by Crown Prince Abdullah bin Abdulaziz Al Saud. A royal decree was subsequently issued to complete the required regulatory procedures.

== Campuses ==
The university operates across 27 campuses in Abha and various governorates of the Asir Region. One of the most prominent is the University City in Al-Fara'a.

== Academic organization ==
The university is organized into four main academic clusters:

- Humanities and social sciences colleges
- Scientific colleges
- Applied colleges
- Health colleges

== Colleges ==
Among the university’s main colleges are:

- College of Sharia and Fundamentals of Religion
- College of Education
- College of Arts and Humanities
- College of Languages and Translation
- College of Law
- College of Tourism and Hospitality
- College of Culture and Arts
- College of Business
- College of Engineering
- College of Science
- College of Computer Science
- College of Architecture and Planning
- Applied colleges across the region
- College of Medicine
- College of Pharmacy
- College of Dentistry
- College of Applied Medical Sciences
- College of Nursing

== Presidency ==
The university is headed by Prof. Faleh bin Raja Allah Al-Solami.

== Former presidents ==
President	Period
Abdullah bin Mohammed Al-Rashid	1999 – 2012
Abdulrahman Al-Dawood	2012 – 2016
Faleh Al-Solami	2016 – 2024
Saad bin Mohammed bin Dajam	2024 (acting)

== Rankings ==
The university has achieved notable rankings:

- Ranked among the top 500 universities globally (Shanghai Ranking)
- Ranked among leading Arab universities (QS Arab Ranking)
- Listed in Times Higher Education global rankings

== See also ==
- List of universities and colleges in Saudi Arabia
