= Shaqra University =

Government university in Saudi Arabia

- جامعة شقراء
- Type: Public
- Established: 2009
- President: Ali Bin Mohammed Alseaf
- Faculty: 1980
- Students: 32000
- Location: Main Campus, Al Duwadimi Road, Shaqra, Riyadh, Saudi Arabia; 25°10′24.5″N 45°08′35.6″E
- Campus: Suburban and rural. Multiple sites, spread across approx. 450 km (280 mi)
- Website: www.su.edu.sa

Shaqra University (SU; Arabic: جامعة شقراء [ALA-LC: Jāmiʻat Shaqrāʼ]) is a public university in Shaqra, Saudi Arabia. It comes under the supervision of the Ministry of Education. The university comprises twenty-four colleges that span a diverse range of disciplines. Its main campus is situated in Shaqra, while its colleges are distributed across a vast area of the Kingdom, covering several governorates and sub-governorates to the west of Riyadh.

== History ==
Shaqra University was established on the 3rd of Ramadan 1430 (Gregorian date 24 August 2009), as per the decision of King Abdullah of Saudi Arabia, the Prime Minister and the Chairman of the Higher Education Council, Saudi Arabia.

Previous Rectors
	Name
1	Saeed bin Turki Al-Mulla
2	Khalid bin Saad bin Said
3	Khalid Bin Saad Al Muqrin
4	Adnan Alshiha
5	ِAwad Al-asmari
6	Ali Alsaif

== University faculties ==
The university currently has 20 colleges distributed in the governorates and sub-governorates, namely Shaqra, Al-Quwaiiyah, Al-Duwadimi, Sajir, Dhurma, Afif, Al-Muzahimiyah and Thadiq wa Mahmal. The colleges of Shaqra University are spread across a wide area of approximately.

While geographic distribution enhances the university's accessibility and impact, serving a wide array of communities throughout the region, it has also put a strain on resources. This prompted the university to undergo a re-structuring process. Such re-structuring plans and closure of branches caused communities in the region to feel harmed as rural youth in the region are deined educational opportunities.

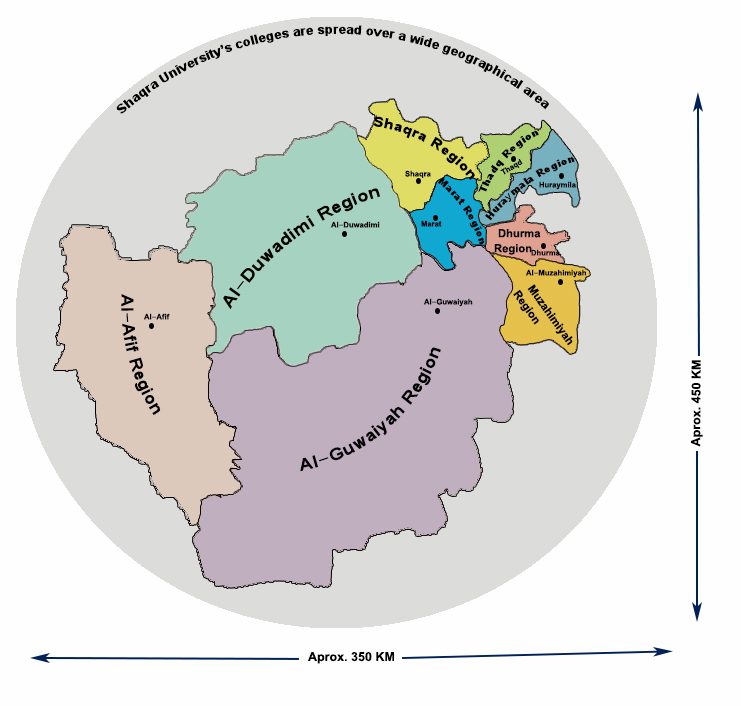
Geographical Area of Shaqra University

=== Colleges at Shaqra University ===
Colleges at Shaqra University
Shaqra	Afif	Dhurma
College of Medicine; College of Computing and Information Technology; Applied College; College of Applied Medical Sciences; College of Science and Humanities; College of Education	College of Science and Humanities; College of Business Administration	College of Science and Humanities
Dawadmi	Al Quwaiiyah	
College of Engineering; College of Education; College of Science and Humanities; Applied College (branch); College of Applied Medical Sciences; College of Pharmacy; College of Medicine	College of Applied Medical Sciences; Applied College (branch); College of Science and Humanities	
Sajir	Thadq	Al Muzahimiyah
College of Science and Arts	College of Science and Humanities	College of Education

== Ranking ==
In international rankings over the past decade, the university has either been placed very low or not listed at all.

=== QS Ranking ===
The university first appeared in the QS ranking in 2022, but was not ranked in 2023, 2024, 2025, or 2026.

=== Times Higher Education ===
Shaqra University entered the Times Higher Education World University Rankings for the first time in 2026. In that edition, it was placed in the 1001–1200 band globally, with a research environment score of 9.4 and a teaching quality score of 17.1.

=== Webometrics ===
In the Webometrics ranking, the university was ranked 2,554 in 2025, down from 2,524 in 2024. A Saudi newspaper (Okaz) reported that in 2018 the university dropped over 300 places in one year.

=== U.S. News & World Report ===
In U.S. News & World Report’s Best Global Universities ranking, Shaqra University was ranked #1,573, based on an aggregate of commonly accepted performance indicators.

== Athletics ==
Shaqra University participated in the Gulf championship for universities known as "The Eighth Sports Tournament for Universities and Institutions of Higher Education in the GCC Countries" in November 2017.

In November 2021, Shaqra University table tennis team won first place and the gold medal in the singles category at the Saudi Universities Sports Federation Championship, held at the University of Hail.

Most of these accomplishments are for male athletes only. Female students and staff are not allowed to participate in sports.

== Accreditation ==
Shaqra University has just received full institutional accreditation from the Education and Training Evaluation Commission, represented by the National Commission for Academic Accreditation and Evaluation ("Accreditation"), which is valid until February 2028. This accreditation was granted in recognition of the university's fulfillment of quality and academic accreditation standards through an active strategic plan aimed at achieving its desired goals. Notably, the university also offers programs accredited by the Accreditation Board for Engineering and Technology (ABET) and the National Commission for Academic Accreditation and Evaluation (NCAAA). The currently accredited degrees by the NCAAA include undergraduate programs in Electrical Engineering, Medicine, Computer science, Nursing.

== Collaborations ==
Shaqra University has actively pursued partnerships and collaboration agreements to enhance its academic and research capabilities. Notable collaborations include international memoranda of understanding with University of California, Irvine, University of Sheffield, and Huawei.

== Research ==
The university offers a range of research funding programs to support researchers and encourage innovation. These programs include:

1. High-Quality Publication Support Program: Aims to encourage researchers to publish their work in high-impact scientific journals.
2. Open Access Publication Fee Support Program: Provides funding for publishing costs in open-access journals, making research freely accessible to the public and increasing its reach and impact.
3. Support Program for Sponsored Researchers: Offers support to sponsored researchers, helping them advance their studies and benefit from global academic resources.
4. Regular Research Funding Program: Provides periodic funding to support distinguished research projects in prioritized fields.
5. Community Innovation Support Program: Aims to support research projects that contribute to solving societal challenges and offer innovative solutions to community issues.

According to the university, these programs seek to foster a thriving research environment within the university and support academics in achieving outstanding scientific accomplishments. The university has several periodic refereed scientific journals, and research groups.

== Criticism of Research ==
=== Integrity Index ===
In 2025, a Research Integrity Risk Index (RI), developed by Professor Lokman Meho at the American University of Beirut, was published. Shaqra University was flagged as High Risk in the index and was ranked at 67.

=== Predatory Publishing ===
The quality of some of the research published by affiliated faculty has also been under scrutiny in the scholarly literature, raising the important issue of the pressure to publish in higher academia.

=== Notices of Retractions ===
As per Retraction Watch Database, at least 26 scholarly articles by staff affiliated to Shaqra university as co-authors were retracted for a variety of reasons, including plagiarism, forged authorship and unreliable results.

=== Research Environment ===
A study examined factors hindering a scholarly output by affiliated staff. The study found that insufficient library resources and the lack of research centres are main factors for the poor research quality.

== Women and Gender ==
=== Alleged cases of Abuse ===
News of an alleged harassment case of female students at the university was reported in local media. A report stated that a bus driver contracted with the university was leaving underwear garments in the bus before students got onto the bus for their daily commute. An investigation was launched to verify students' claims. Female students have also reported issues of overcrowding on university buses, which presented a major safety issue. Another alleged case of abuse was reported by medical female students who took issue with the college building. As per Shaqra Newspaper, the dilapidated building was infested with mice and lizards. Further, it was in a bad condition with a collapsed roof.

=== Claims of Discrimination of Women with Disabilities ===
A recent study reported that female students with disabilities were denied opportunities due to their visual impairment.

=== Female Academics ===
Recent research has shed light on the experience of women in the workplace at Shaqra University. A study employing quantitative and qualtitative approaches has reported that female leaders in adiminstrative positions within the university faced challenges as decision-makers, including feeling disempowered to solve problems as they had risen. This has also been proved and substantiated in similar published studies focusing on the limited roles of female academics in the decision-making process in Saudi universities due to gender segregation and the exclusion of women.

Another study has also highlighted the obstacles female academics in nursing faced as researchers. Specifically, female academics in nursing reported instituational barriers, unavailalibity of databases and feeling under-valued.

== Controversies ==
Since its founding, the university main controversies revolved around student satisfaction, recruitment and treatment of staff and faculty. Further, local communities allegedly felt discriminated against, marginalised and excluded.

The backlash from students and local communities against the university prompted the university president then, Dr. Al-shiah, to speak out in 2016. He described the reports as rumors and lies against a university committed to institutional reform.

=== Students' Satisfaction ===
In the past ten years, Shaqra University has received negative media coverage and backlash on social media in regard to its low levels of satisfaction among students.

The most recent controversy happened in 2018 during an "open meeting" between the rector, Awad Al-asmary and a group of medical students. In the meeting, a medical student expressed his concern about the absence of Saudi nationals from the teaching staff body. In response, the rector accused the student of racism against non-Saudi academics in the university. The video, which was circulated widely on social media, caused a major backlash. The video recording of this meeting went viral and spurred the publication of op-ed pieces tackling the absence of professors of Saudi nationality.

In 2020, students have also complained about the size of the classes as the university put classes caps at 90 students.

=== Faculty Recruitment and Alleged Cases of Nepotism ===
In terms of controversies related to its recruitment of staff, such issues have been reported by several local news outlets.

On several occasions, unqualified staff has been allegedly appointed because of their "connections" with high level officials. In 2015, Sabq, a Saudi news website, reported that an unqualified member of staff has been appointed based on the "recommendations" of a member of the Saudi Shura.

=== Jordanian Professors Dispute 2016 ===
In 2016, a dispute came to the fore between a group of contracted Jordanian professors and Shaqra university. The dispute arose after the university signed employment contracts with the professors in Jordan but at a later date did not abide by its agreement. The Jordanian professors took legal action against the university for a breach of contract. The case was settled out of court upon receiving financial compensation.

=== 600 Security Staff and Unpaid Salaries ===
In 2015, 600 security staff made official complaints regarding three months worth of unpaid salaries. The university denied responsibility claiming that the security staff weren't employees of the university, but rather contracted to work for a security company. The security company in turn claimed the reason is due to late due payments from the university.

=== Staff absenteeism and Pay Deductions ===
In September 2025, the Saudi media outlet, Sabq, reported on unauthorised absenteeism among staff in the university. In response, the university announced a number of measures to tackle an authorised absenteeism after summer breaks, including tracking employees attendance through in person sign-in sheets. Sabq also reported on dissatisfaction among staff after pay deduction in cases of authorised or an authorised absenteeism. Rather than a deduction of a full-day pay, staff demanded a deduction of only hours of absence.

== Claims of Exclusion and Marginalisation of Local Communities ==
=== Limited Access to Education ===
While geographic distribution enhances the university's accessibility and impact, serving a wide array of communities throughout the region, it has also put a strain on resources. This prompted the university to undergo a re-structuring process. Such re-structuring plans and closure of branches caused communities in the region to feel harmed as rural youth in the region are deined educational opportunities.

For female students in rural villages, the university denied them the opportunity to use transport services. Some of those rural students were crammed in small cars commuting to campus daily from villages 300 kilometers away. Parents took to media to demand the use of government-funded transportation

=== Denied Employment Opportunities ===
Members of the local communities, especially women, felt discriminated against in terms of employment opportunities as the university sought to recruit staff internationally.

== Outsourced Services and Legal Disputes ==
Since its establishment, Shaqra University outsourced a number of infrastructure services and facilities management to external contractors. In 2022, the university announced a number of contracts worth 116 millions Saudi riyal with a number of companies from the private sector. One of the latest signed contracts was with Waja in 2024 worth 5.7 million.

In terms of disputes, the university announced it ended a contract in 2014 for a breach of contract. Some legal disputes had risen between external contractors, the rulings of which were published by the Saudi Ministry of Justice.

== See also ==
- List of universities and colleges in Saudi Arabia
