= Research Integrity Risk Index =

Research integrity risk metric

Research Integrity Risk Index (RI²) is a diagnostic, bibliometric framework designed to assess institutional exposure to selected research-integrity-related risks. Developed in 2025 by Lokman Meho (لقمان محّو), a professor and University Librarian at the American University of Beirut, RI² is presented as complementary to conventional global university rankings, which primarily emphasize publication volume and citation counts. RI² evaluates universities using three institution-level bibliometric indicators associated with integrity risk signals in scholarly publishing: retracted journal articles, publications in journals that were subsequently delisted from major bibliographic databases, and institutional self-citation patterns. The framework emerged amid broader debates over the limitations of citation- and volume-based ranking methodologies in capturing research integrity-related risks.

== How does RI² work? ==
=== Methodology ===
RI² assesses academic institutions using three bibliometric indicators derived from verifiable publications and citation data.

Delisted Journal Risk (D Rate) measures the percentage of an institution's research output published in journals that were later delisted from Scopus or Web of Science following those databases' re-evaluation processes for editorial or publishing standards.

Retraction Risk (R-Rate) measures the number of retracted journal articles per 1,000 published articles over a defined publication window. Retraction data are compiled and cross-validated using multiple independent sources, including the Retraction Watch Database, MEDLINE, Scopus, and Web of Science, with filtering procedures applied to exclude duplicate records and retractions unrelated to authorship issues.

Self citation Rate (S-Rate) measures the proportion of citations to an institution's publications that originate from the same institution. Citation data are sourced from InCites, and the indicator is reported descriptively and interpreted in relation to peer institutions within the same field classifications.

All three indicators are field normalized and benchmarked against a fixed global reference group comprising the 1,000 publishing universities worldwide. Each indicator is scaled to a 0–1 range using Min-Max normalization with caps applied to extreme values, and the normalized indicators are combined using equal weighting to generate the composite RI2 score.

Based on their composite scores, institutions are assigned to one of five percentile-based risk tiers: Low Risk, Normal Variation, Watch List, High Risk, and Red Flag. Tier placement reflects relative exposure to integrity-related publishing risks and is not intended as an assessment of research quality, misconduct, or institutional performance.

Detailed methodology is available online on the official RI² website.

Tier	Percentile Range	Interpretation
Red Flag	≥ 95th	Extreme anomalies; systemic integrity risk
High Risk	≥ 90th and < 95th	Significant deviation from global norms
Watch List	≥ 75th and < 90th	Moderately elevated risk; emerging concerns
Normal Variation	≥ 50th and < 75th	Within expected global variance
Low Risk	< 50th	Strong adherence to publishing integrity norms

== Output and visualization ==
RI² website provides tabular results for the world's most publishing universities along with world maps that illustrate country-level D-Rate and R-rate, allowing examination of geographic variations in risk profiles.

== Red-flagged universities by Research Integrity Risk Index (RI²) ==
This table lists the universities flagged as highest-risk (Red Tier) in the Research Integrity Risk Index (RI²).

	Institution Name	Country	Field	Articles	D	R	S	Norm D	Norm R	Norm S	RI2 score
1	Yogyakarta State University	Indonesia	Multidisciplinary	1,389	22.462	56.155	33.646	1	1	1	1
2	State University of Padang	Indonesia	Multidisciplinary	1,309	14.896	48.892	22.932	1	1	1	1
3	Saveetha Institute of Medical and Technical Sciences (Deemed to be University)	India	Multidisciplinary	10,822	11.467	13.306	16.955	1	1	0.955	0.985
4	Universitas Sebelas Maret	Indonesia	Multidisciplinary	2,667	9.336	13.873	16.754	0.959	1	0.94	0.966
5	State University of Malang	Indonesia	Multidisciplinary	1,569	11.982	19.757	16.143	1	1	0.894	0.964
6	Indonesia University of Education	Indonesia	Multidisciplinary	1,286	12.208	7.776	13.357	1	1	0.682	0.894
7	Beni-Suef University	Egypt	Multidisciplinary	2,875	5.773	5.217	18.418	0.577	1	1	0.859
8	Jawaharlal Nehru Technological University Anantapur	India	STEM	2,000	13.35	9.5	14.54	1	0.988	0.541	0.843
9	Chung Shan Medical University	Taiwan	Medical & Health Sciences	1,605	2.679	3.738	11.09	0.636	1	0.892	0.842
10	University of Calabar	Nigeria	Multidisciplinary	1,298	5.161	14.637	21.308	0.512	1	1	0.837
11	Zarqa University	Jordan	Multidisciplinary	1,283	12.47	3.117	15.092	1	0.641	0.814	0.818
12	Guilan University of Medical Sciences	Iran	Medical & Health Sciences	1,466	1.841	20.463	12.394	0.411	1	1	0.803
13	Applied Science Private University	Jordan	Multidisciplinary	2,440	11.065	5.327	9.138	1	1	0.361	0.787
14	Sultan Idris Education University	Malaysia	Multidisciplinary	1,206	16.417	4.975	9.011	1	1	0.352	0.784
15	Qassim University	Saudi Arabia	Multidisciplinary	5,378	8.423	4.09	12.778	0.861	0.842	0.638	0.78
16	Jazan University	Saudi Arabia	Multidisciplinary	4,233	8.221	5.669	10.749	0.839	1	0.484	0.774
17	Taibah University	Saudi Arabia	Multidisciplinary	3,337	7.941	3.596	14.415	0.809	0.74	0.762	0.771
18	Kalinga Institute of Industrial Technology	India	Multidisciplinary	2,406	10.016	5.403	8.511	1	1	0.314	0.771
19	JAIN (Deemed-to-be University)	India	STEM	2,352	15.858	6.377	15.935	1	0.663	0.629	0.764
20	Rashtrasant Tukadoji Maharaj Nagpur University	India	STEM	1,185	13.248	4.219	19.345	1	0.438	0.844	0.761
21	Daffodil International University	Bangladesh	Multidisciplinary	1,663	10.342	9.019	8.068	1	1	0.28	0.76
22	Dr. D. Y. Patil Vidyapeeth, Pune	India	Medical & Health Sciences	1,239	7.102	4.035	6.26	1	1	0.244	0.748
23	University of Hail	Saudi Arabia	Multidisciplinary	3,195	7.042	9.076	11.071	0.713	1	0.508	0.74
24	Majmaah University	Saudi Arabia	Multidisciplinary	1,893	10.353	7.923	7.286	1	1	0.221	0.74
25	Hashemite University	Jordan	Multidisciplinary	2,243	7.802	3.12	14.672	0.794	0.642	0.782	0.739
26	Vel Tech University	India	STEM	2,024	14.723	9.881	9.269	1	1	0.208	0.736
27	SRM Institute of Science and Technology	India	STEM	8,594	9.588	10.356	12.449	0.796	1	0.409	0.735
28	Al-Azhar University	Egypt	Multidisciplinary	6,326	4.947	3.477	21.34	0.489	0.715	1	0.735
29	Grigore T. Popa University of Medicine and Pharmacy	Romania	Medical & Health Sciences	1,376	5.45	0.726	15.242	1	0.199	1	0.733
30	Koneru Lakshmaiah Education Foundation	India	STEM	3,967	17.091	14.368	9.032	1	1	0.193	0.731
31	Al Ahliyya Amman University	Jordan	Multidisciplinary	1,733	10.617	2.308	13.749	1	0.475	0.712	0.729
32	Inonu University	Turkey	Multidisciplinary	1,650	4.545	12.121	14.026	0.446	1	0.733	0.726
33	Duy Tan University	Vietnam	STEM	1,862	6.981	10.741	15.473	0.575	1	0.6	0.725
34	University of Sulaimani	Iraq	STEM	1,257	7.637	6.364	19.755	0.631	0.662	0.87	0.721
35	Zhejiang Shuren University	China	Multidisciplinary	1,218	9.031	6.568	7.513	0.926	1	0.238	0.721
36	Van Lang University	Vietnam	STEM	1,111	9	9	13.468	0.747	0.936	0.473	0.719
37	Mashhad University of Medical Sciences	Iran	Medical & Health Sciences	4,820	1.763	2.697	13.372	0.39	0.739	1	0.709
38	Iran University of Medical Sciences	Iran	Medical & Health Sciences	6,807	2.086	4.407	9.221	0.476	1	0.641	0.706
39	L.N. Gumilyov Eurasian National University	Kazakhstan	STEM	1,682	10.344	4.161	18.836	0.861	0.432	0.812	0.702
40	Parul University	India	Multidisciplinary	1,209	12.572	3.308	9.986	1	0.681	0.426	0.702
41	King Faisal University	Saudi Arabia	Multidisciplinary	4,961	9.352	2.62	12.323	0.96	0.539	0.603	0.701
42	University of Baghdad	Iraq	Multidisciplinary	6,805	14.136	0.44	20.136	1	0.09	1	0.696
43	Menoufia University	Egypt	Multidisciplinary	3,464	6.322	11.836	10.075	0.636	1	0.433	0.689
44	The Islamic University, Najaf	Iraq	STEM	1,554	11.454	21.879	7.68	0.955	1	0.108	0.687
45	Jawaharlal Nehru Technological University Hyderabad	India	STEM	8,447	12.821	9.707	6.755	1	1	0.049	0.683
46	Al-Nahrain University	Iraq	STEM	1,636	11.674	1.833	20.007	0.973	0.19	0.886	0.683
47	Umm Al-Qura University	Saudi Arabia	Multidisciplinary	5,818	7.803	4.64	8.252	0.795	0.955	0.294	0.681
48	University of Mosul	Iraq	STEM	2,454	10.024	2.037	29.072	0.833	0.211	1	0.681
49	Al Jouf University	Saudi Arabia	Multidisciplinary	3,451	9.359	2.897	10.537	0.961	0.596	0.468	0.675
50	Shaqra University	Saudi Arabia	Multidisciplinary	1,618	7.478	9.27	7.882	0.76	1	0.266	0.675
51	Datta Meghe Institute of Medical Sciences	India	Multidisciplinary	1,118	8.944	25.939	5.695	0.917	1	0.1	0.672
52	Asia University Taiwan	Taiwan	Multidisciplinary	2,274	4.837	5.716	11.402	0.477	1	0.533	0.67
53	University of Kufa	Iraq	Multidisciplinary	1,778	13.442	1.687	13.099	1	0.347	0.662	0.67
54	Taif University	Saudi Arabia	STEM	5,301	8.866	10.564	10.124	0.735	1	0.262	0.666
55	University of Babylon	Iraq	STEM	2,471	19.83	0	23.22	1	0	1	0.666
56	Christ University, Bangalore	India	Multidisciplinary	2,289	6.596	3.931	11.256	0.665	0.809	0.522	0.666
57	Al-Farahidi University	Iraq	STEM	1,162	15.748	22.375	4.271	1	1	0	0.666
58	University of Bisha	Saudi Arabia	Multidisciplinary	1,323	9.674	2.267	11.412	0.995	0.466	0.534	0.665
59	Kerman University of Medical Sciences	Iran	Medical & Health Sciences	2,382	2.267	2.099	11.103	0.525	0.575	0.894	0.664
60	Sathyabama Institute of Science and Technology	India	STEM	1,603	11.79	15.595	5.858	0.983	1	0	0.661
61	Al-Mustaqbal University College	Iraq	STEM	2,491	9.875	17.663	8.2	0.821	1	0.141	0.654
62	Osmania University	India	STEM	2,116	7.939	6.616	15.619	0.656	0.688	0.609	0.651
63	Universitas Hasanuddin	Indonesia	Multidisciplinary	2,828	11.103	0	16.859	1	0	0.948	0.649
64	King Khalid University	Saudi Arabia	STEM	11,363	7.7	7.832	13.806	0.636	0.814	0.495	0.648
65	Prince Sultan University (PSU)	Saudi Arabia	STEM	2,548	8.084	7.064	14.559	0.669	0.734	0.542	0.648
66	Al Baha University	Saudi Arabia	Multidisciplinary	1,526	6.618	2.621	14.099	0.668	0.539	0.738	0.648
67	NITTE	India	Multidisciplinary	1,367	11.046	2.926	8.872	1	0.602	0.341	0.648
68	Khwaja Fareed University of Engineering & Information Technology	Pakistan	STEM	1,140	5.877	12.28	13.327	0.481	1	0.464	0.648
69	University Of Anbar	Iraq	STEM	1,646	12.272	3.645	14.819	1	0.379	0.558	0.646
70	Carol Davila University of Medicine and Pharmacy	Romania	Medical & Health Sciences	3,180	4.245	0.314	10.684	1	0.086	0.838	0.641
71	Gandhi Institute of Technology and Management	India	STEM	2,731	11.973	6.59	9.704	0.999	0.685	0.236	0.64
72	Siksha ‘O’ Anusandhan University	India	Multidisciplinary	2,710	6.088	1.476	17.87	0.611	0.303	1	0.638
73	Bharathidasan University	India	STEM	2,392	7.566	6.688	15.4	0.625	0.695	0.595	0.638
74	Chouaib Doukkali University	Morocco	STEM	1,396	9.24	1.432	22.87	0.767	0.149	1	0.638
75	Gondar University	Ethiopia	Medical & Health Sciences	2,264	1.899	1.766	11.853	0.426	0.484	0.994	0.635
76	The University of Lahore	Pakistan	STEM	2,986	6.597	6.028	17.588	0.543	0.627	0.733	0.634
77	Karunya University	India	STEM	1,238	9.369	8.885	9.125	0.778	0.924	0.199	0.634
78	Tanta University	Egypt	Multidisciplinary	4,549	3.978	3.297	15.339	0.385	0.678	0.833	0.632
79	Mohamed I University	Morocco	Multidisciplinary	1,590	7.547	0.628	21.298	0.767	0.129	1	0.632
80	Ajman University	United Arab Emirates	Multidisciplinary	2,265	7.461	5.739	6.114	0.758	1	0.132	0.63
81	University of Nigeria	Nigeria	Multidisciplinary	3,382	3.134	4.73	12.489	0.295	0.973	0.616	0.628
82	Periyar University	India	STEM	1,339	9.559	16.43	7.409	0.794	1	0.091	0.628
83	Western Caspian University	Azerbaijan	STEM	1,157	5.185	9.507	13.442	0.423	0.988	0.472	0.628
84	Princess Nourah Bint Abdulrahman University	Saudi Arabia	STEM	8,852	7.263	6.213	16.027	0.599	0.646	0.635	0.627
85	Symbiosis International University	India	Multidisciplinary	3,055	10.736	3.6	6.063	1	0.741	0.128	0.623
86	Shahid Beheshti University of Medical Sciences	Iran	Medical & Health Sciences	8,818	2.37	2.268	9.591	0.553	0.621	0.691	0.622
87	City University of Macau	Macao	Multidisciplinary	1,139	5.794	17.559	8.141	0.58	1	0.286	0.622
88	Graphic Era Hill University	India	Multidisciplinary	1,153	12.749	1.734	11	1	0.357	0.503	0.62
89	Prince Sattam Bin Abdulaziz University	Saudi Arabia	STEM	8,736	9.752	7.783	9.654	0.81	0.809	0.232	0.617
90	Universitas Airlangga	Indonesia	Multidisciplinary	6,113	13.07	1.472	11.602	1	0.303	0.549	0.617
91	Mohammed V University in Rabat	Morocco	Multidisciplinary	4,596	6.157	1.087	19.08	0.618	0.223	1	0.614
92	Cairo University	Egypt	Multidisciplinary	12,134	3.873	2.554	16.753	0.374	0.525	0.94	0.613
93	Universidad Internacional de La Rioja	Spain	Multidisciplinary	1,357	5.453	3.684	11.255	0.543	0.758	0.522	0.608
94	Universidad de Tarapacá	Chile	Multidisciplinary	1,254	3.588	4.784	10.898	0.343	0.985	0.495	0.608
95	Padjadjaran University	Indonesia	Multidisciplinary	3,910	8.081	1.79	12.666	0.824	0.368	0.63	0.607
96	Firat University	Turkey	Multidisciplinary	2,389	8.915	1.255	12.929	0.914	0.258	0.65	0.607
97	University of Ilorin	Nigeria	Multidisciplinary	1,633	2.878	3.061	16.519	0.267	0.63	0.922	0.607
98	Karpagam Academy of Higher Education	India	STEM	1,420	7.605	9.859	8.954	0.628	1	0.188	0.605
99	Kalasalingam University	India	STEM	1,162	7.831	6.024	14.544	0.647	0.626	0.541	0.605
100	King Abdulaziz University	Saudi Arabia	Multidisciplinary	11,720	6.348	4.095	8.654	0.639	0.843	0.325	0.602
101	Universiti Kebangsaan Malaysia	Malaysia	Multidisciplinary	8,628	6.131	2.897	12.217	0.616	0.596	0.595	0.602
102	Government College University Lahore	Pakistan	STEM	1,890	7.248	6.349	14.316	0.598	0.66	0.527	0.595
103	Universidade Federal de Uberlândia	Brazil	Multidisciplinary	2,465	2.555	7.302	11.626	0.233	1	0.55	0.594
104	University of Tikrit	Iraq	STEM	1,294	11.746	1.545	16.129	0.979	0.16	0.641	0.594
105	Universitas Andalas	Indonesia	Multidisciplinary	1,539	6.692	1.949	13.613	0.676	0.401	0.701	0.593
106	Universitas Syiah Kuala	Indonesia	Multidisciplinary	1,350	14.444	0.74	12.571	1	0.152	0.622	0.591
107	Al-Ayen University	Iraq	STEM	1,402	10.271	8.559	6.356	0.854	0.89	0.024	0.589
108	Universidade Federal de Goiás	Brazil	Multidisciplinary	3,220	3.354	6.211	10.235	0.318	1	0.445	0.588
109	Manonmaniam Sundaranar University	India	STEM	1,369	7.669	7.304	11.829	0.634	0.759	0.37	0.588
110	University of Pune	India	STEM	4,539	15.884	3.745	11.768	1	0.389	0.366	0.585
111	University of Management and Technology	Pakistan	STEM	1,877	7.032	3.729	18.438	0.579	0.387	0.787	0.585
112	Abu Dhabi University	United Arab Emirates	Multidisciplinary	1,078	6.215	4.638	6.698	0.625	0.954	0.176	0.585
113	Islamia University	Pakistan	STEM	3,191	5.202	5.014	18.656	0.424	0.521	0.801	0.582
114	Sharda University	India	Multidisciplinary	1,516	7.189	3.957	7.062	0.729	0.814	0.204	0.582
115	University of Technology- Iraq	Iraq	STEM	2,909	5.912	2.406	23.633	0.484	0.25	1	0.578
116	Jiangxi University of Finance and Economics	China	Multidisciplinary	1,103	6.074	9.972	5.89	0.61	1	0.115	0.575
117	Mansoura University	Egypt	Multidisciplinary	7,172	5.368	2.509	13.146	0.534	0.516	0.666	0.572
118	Chandigarh University	India	STEM	4,716	8.015	9.541	6.941	0.663	0.992	0.061	0.572
119	Annamalai University	India	STEM	2,050	13.121	4.39	10.119	1	0.456	0.262	0.572
120	Kafrelsheikh University	Egypt	STEM	2,804	5.848	3.566	19.668	0.479	0.37	0.865	0.571
121	Lviv Polytechnic National University	Ukraine	STEM	1,707	8.025	0.585	21.652	0.664	0.06	0.99	0.571
122	SASTRA	India	STEM	1,325	4.754	9.056	12.096	0.386	0.942	0.387	0.571
123	Visvesvaraya Technological University	India	STEM	6,545	11.993	5.5	8.183	1	0.572	0.14	0.57
124	Ain Shams University	Egypt	Multidisciplinary	7,203	4.539	1.665	16.435	0.445	0.342	0.916	0.568
125	Al-Mustansiriyah University	Iraq	STEM	2,566	9.586	1.558	17.786	0.796	0.162	0.746	0.568
126	Ibn Tofail University	Morocco	STEM	2,182	8.524	0	21.722	0.706	0	0.994	0.567
127	Vellore Institute of Technology	India	STEM	10,765	5.852	6.967	13.789	0.479	0.724	0.493	0.566
128	Sohag University	Egypt	STEM	1,687	5.453	2.371	23.626	0.446	0.246	1	0.564
129	University Utara Malaysia	Malaysia	Multidisciplinary	1,648	15.898	1.213	10.179	1	0.249	0.441	0.563
130	University of International Business and Economics	China	Multidisciplinary	1,476	5.826	4.742	6.001	0.583	0.976	0.123	0.561
131	Hawassa University	Ethiopia	Multidisciplinary	1,409	2.625	4.968	10.194	0.24	1	0.442	0.561
132	Dr. A.P.J. Abdul Kalam Technical University	India	STEM	2,861	11.254	5.592	8.528	0.938	0.581	0.161	0.56
133	Universiti Sultan Zainal Abidin	Malaysia	Multidisciplinary	1,345	7.434	2.23	10.504	0.755	0.459	0.465	0.56
134	Future University in Egypt	Egypt	STEM	1,979	7.731	10.611	6.387	0.639	1	0.026	0.555
135	VIT-AP University	India	STEM	1,597	9.016	5.009	12.274	0.748	0.521	0.398	0.555
136	University of Mutah	Jordan	Multidisciplinary	1,174	9.625	0.851	10.968	0.99	0.175	0.5	0.555
137	Rajshahi University	Bangladesh	Multidisciplinary	1,097	7.748	1.823	10.956	0.789	0.375	0.5	0.554
138	Sakarya University	Turkey	Multidisciplinary	2,181	3.943	1.375	17.416	0.381	0.283	0.99	0.552
139	Northern Borders University	Saudi Arabia	STEM	2,049	11.908	3.416	10.833	0.993	0.355	0.307	0.552
140	University of the Punjab	Pakistan	STEM	4,397	8.687	4.775	12.832	0.72	0.496	0.433	0.55
141	Vietnam National University, Hanoi	Vietnam	Multidisciplinary	2,532	6.516	1.974	11.942	0.657	0.406	0.575	0.546
142	Universiti Sains Malaysia	Malaysia	Multidisciplinary	9,418	8.059	1.805	10.028	0.822	0.371	0.429	0.541
143	Sunway University	Malaysia	Multidisciplinary	2,583	5.381	3.484	9.212	0.535	0.717	0.367	0.54
144	Maharishi Markandeshwar University, Mullana	India	Multidisciplinary	1,175	9.276	2.553	6.16	0.952	0.525	0.135	0.538
145	Bharati Vidyapeeth University	India	Multidisciplinary	1,469	13.886	2.722	5.011	1	0.56	0.048	0.536
146	Kyiv National Taras Shevchenko University	Ukraine	Multidisciplinary	2,515	5.168	0.397	17.179	0.513	0.081	0.972	0.522
147	UCSI University	Malaysia	Multidisciplinary	1,579	7.916	2.533	7.5	0.807	0.521	0.237	0.522
148	Yarmouk University	Jordan	Multidisciplinary	1,862	7.518	2.148	8.97	0.764	0.442	0.349	0.518
149	Universiti Teknologi MARA	Malaysia	Multidisciplinary	7,023	11.804	1.708	6.912	1	0.351	0.192	0.514
150	Minia University	Egypt	Multidisciplinary	2,427	4.738	2.472	11.659	0.467	0.508	0.553	0.509
151	Qena University	Egypt	Multidisciplinary	1,638	3.907	3.052	11.249	0.378	0.628	0.522	0.509
152	China Medical University Taichung	Taiwan	Multidisciplinary	6,184	4.932	3.395	8.84	0.487	0.699	0.339	0.508
153	Damanhour University	Egypt	Multidisciplinary	1,214	3.624	2.471	13.074	0.347	0.508	0.661	0.505
154	Sefako Makgatho Health Sciences University	South Africa	Multidisciplinary	1,167	3.513	0.856	19.274	0.335	0.176	1	0.504

== External reception and Adoption ==
RI² has received coverage in international scientific and higher-education media. A 2025 article in Nature discussed institutional retraction patterns and cited RI² data in its analysis of universities with high numbers of retracted publications. University World News reported on the development of RI² as a response to concerns about metric-driven distortions in global university rankings, describing the index as a diagnostic tool rather than a punitive ranking.

Regional and national media outlets have also reported on RI² findings in country-specific contexts. In India, Science Chronicle discussed universities classified in the highest RI² risk tiers in the context of debates on research assessment and retractions. Coverage in Al-Ghad (Jordan) similarly reported on RI² results in relation to national higher-education institutions.

Beyond media reporting, RI² has been referenced in scholarly and policy-oriented discussions on integrity-aware approaches to research assessment. A commentary published by the Indian Society of Artificial Intelligence and Law (ISAIL) cited RI² in discussions on incorporating research-integrity considerations into institutional evaluation frameworks.

In 2026, Egypt's Supreme Council of Universities of the Ministry of Higher Education and Scientific Research issued a government report titled Research Integrity Risk Index (RI²), presenting RI² as an early-warning, data-driven framework for assessing institution-level integrity-related publishing risks and offering recommendations for Egyptian universities and research-governance bodies.

== Related methodological developments ==
Following the introduction of RI², subsequent work in the research-assessment literature has employed institution-level indicators similar to those proposed in the framework. In particular, retractions, publications in delisted journals, and self-citation were recently used by John P. A. Ioannidis and collaborators as adjustment factors in an institution-level percentile ranking framework.

== See also ==
- Retraction Watch
- Scientific misconduct
- Citation Impact
- Predatory publishing
- Retraction in academic publishing
- Publish or perish
- Citation
