= Al Yamamah University =

Private university in Riyadh, Saudi Arabia

Coordinates: 24°51′49″N 46°35′40″E

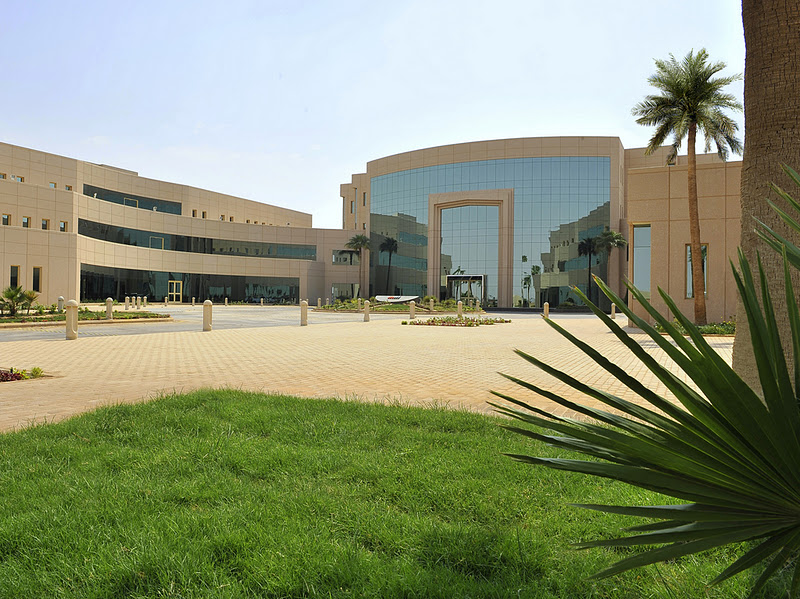
- Main campus of Al Yamamah University
- Other names: YU
- Type: Private
- Established: 2001; 25 years ago
- Chairman: Khalid Al Khudair
- President: Hussam Ramadan
- Location: Riyadh, Saudi Arabia
- Website: www.yu.edu.sa

Al Yamamah University (جامعة اليمامة, abbreviated as YU) is a private university located in Riyadh, Saudi Arabia. It is recognized by the country's Ministry of Higher Education.

The institution was established by Khalid bin Mohammed Al-Khudair, who had earlier founded Al-Tarbiyah Al-Namouthajiyah Schools in 1957.

== History ==
Al Yamamah began as Al Yamamah College (YC) in 2001, admitting its first male students in 2004 and female students in 2006. It was granted university status by royal decree in December 2008.

The first graduation ceremony was held in June 2009, and a new women's campus was inaugurated in November 2009.

== Academic programs ==
=== College of Business Administration ===
Offers bachelor's degrees in business administration (BBA) with specializations in accounting, finance, management, marketing, and management information systems. It also offers an Executive MBA program.

=== College of Engineering and Architecture ===
Provides bachelor's degrees in software engineering, network engineering and security, industrial engineering, architecture, and interior architecture.

=== College of Law ===
Offers undergraduate degrees in public law and private law.

=== College of Computer and Information Systems ===
Grants Bachelor of Science degrees in e-commerce, graphics and multimedia, networking and security, and programming and databases.

=== Deanship of Continuing Education and Community Service ===
Delivers training and development programs for individuals and organizations. While most instruction at the university is in English, some continuing education courses are conducted in Arabic.

== Accreditation ==
In 2008, Al Yamamah was authorized to operate as a private university by the Ministry of Higher Education. Its programs are accredited by the National Commission for Academic Accreditation and Assessment (NCAAA), which oversees higher education quality assurance in Saudi Arabia.

In 2023, the university signed an agreement with the Education and Training Evaluation Commission to accredit five bachelor's programs, including Business Administration with specializations in Accounting, Finance, Marketing, and Management, as well as Law.

== Campus ==
The university is situated north of Riyadh on the Al Qassim Highway, with separate campuses for male and female students in accordance with local norms.

The university later expanded beyond Riyadh with an academic complex in Al Khobar in the Eastern Province. The university describes the Al Khobar site as part of its expansion efforts outside Riyadh. In 2023, Al Yamamah University–Khobar announced the opening of the College of Engineering and Architecture and the College of Law at the campus, with programs aimed at serving labor-market needs in the Eastern Province.

Facilities on the men's campus include academic buildings, computer labs, research centers, a library, an auditorium, a mosque, and various sports areas. The women's campus includes academic and administrative spaces, a library, and recreational areas.

== See also ==
- List of universities and colleges in Saudi Arabia
