= Thomas Trenczek =

German law professor and mediator

Thomas Trenczek (born 1960) is a German law professor and mediator. He studied both law (bar exams and Ph.D.), and social sciences (M.A.) in Tübingen (Germany), and Minneapolis (USA). He is owner of the Steinberg Institute for Mediation and Conflict Management (SIMK) Hannover and works as a mediation trainer.

Trenczek has spent time in the US, Australia, and NZ, to study and train in mediation/alternative dispute resolution (ADR), and restorative justice. Beyond that, his interdisciplinary focus is on law and social control, criminology, as well as youth (protection, welfare, criminal) law. He is professor of law at the Ernst Abbe University in Jena, visiting scholar of Griffith University in Brisbane (Australia) Law School, as well as the School of Social and Cultural Studies, Massey University (NZ). Prof. Trenczek is initiator of the “Socrates Network of European University Schools of Social Work” (SocNet98).

Trenzek is cofounder and chairman of the non-profit WAAGE ("scales") Dispute Resolution Center Hannover, which offers different mediation services, among others mediation in escalated parental/family disputes and a victim-offender mediation/restorative justice service. He is the author of some 200 articles and books about mediation, restorative justice, youth law, and criminology.

== Works ==
In English (for German publications and other languages see):

- [German Handbook] Mediation and Conflict Management - Editor; 2.ed., Nomos Verlag Baden-Baden 2017, ISBN 978-3-8487-2948-7
- Embedding Mediation and Dispute Resolution into Statutory Civil Law: The Example of Germany; (cowriter S. Loode) in: Ian Macduff (ed.): Essays on Mediation - Dealing with Disputes in the 21st Century; WoltersKluwer, Alphen aan den Rijn 2016, chapter 12 (pp. 177 - 192).
- Restorative justice: new paradigm, sensitising theory or even practice? Restorative Justice: an International Journal; special book review forum – A tribute to Howard Zehr, Routledge 2015, 3:3, 453–459.
- Restorative justice: new paradigm, sensitising theory or even practice?. Restorative Justice: an International Journal; special book review forum - A tribute to Howard Zehr, Routledge 2015, 3:3, 453–459.
- Beyond Restorative Justice to Restorative Practice; in Cornwell, D./Blad, J./Wright, M. (eds.) Civilizing Criminal Justice, Hook, Hampshire (UK) 2013, pp. 409 – 428.
- "Mediation made in Germany – a quality product" (together with S. Loode), Australasian Dispute Resolution Journal 23 (2012), 61 ff.
- Mediation in Germany (together with N. Alexander and W. Gottwald) in: Alexander, N. (ed.) Global Trends in Mediation, 2nd ed., Amsterdam 2006, pp. 223 – 258.
- Victim Offender Mediation and Restorative Justice - the European landscape (together with C. Pelikan); in Sullivan, D./Tifft, L. (eds.) Handbook of Restorative Justice: A Global Perspective; Taylor and Francis, London (UK) 2006, pp. 63–90.
- Mediation in Germany; (together with W.Gottwald u. N.Alexander) in: Alexander, N. (ed.) Global Trends in Mediation, Dr Otto Schmidt Verlag, Köln 2003, pp. 179–212.
- Within or outside the system? Restorative justice attempts and the penal system; in: E. Weitekamp/H.-J. Kerner (eds.) Restorative Justice in Context. International practice and directions; Willan Publishing, Cullompton, UK 2003; pp. 272–284.
- Victim-offender-reconciliation: The danger of cooptation and a useful reconsideration of law theory; Contemporary Justice Review, 2002, vol. 5; pp. 23–34.
- Victim-Offender-Mediation in Germany – ADR under the Shadow of the Criminal Law?; Bond Law Review, special issue: International Dispute Resolution; vol 13, no. 2; December 2001, pp. 364–380.
- Restorative Justice as Participation. Theory, Law, Experience and Research; together with L. Netzig in: B. Galaway/J. Hudson: Restorative Justice: International Perspektives; Monsey, N.Y./Amsterdam, NL; 1996 pp. 241 – 260. [VG-21.01.97]
- Implementation and Acceptance of Victim/Offender Mediation Programs in the Federal Republic of Germany: A Survey of Criminal Justice Institutions; together with W. Bilsky u. H. Pfeiffer in: Kaiser, G./Kury, H./Albrecht, H.-J. (eds.) Victims and Criminal Justice; Freiburg 1991, pp. 507 – 539.
- VORP - Some central issues in mediating the victim-offender conflict; in: Junger Tas, J./ Boendermaker, L./van der Laan, P. (eds.) The future of the juvenile justice system; Leuven/Amersfoort 1991, pp. 347 – 363.
- A Review and Assessment of Victim-Offender Reconciliation Programming in West-Germany; in: Galaway, B./Hudson, J. (eds.) Criminal Justice, Restitution and Reconciliation; Monsey, N.Y./USA 1990, pp. 109 – 124.
