= CDIO (disambiguation) =

CDIO may refer to:

- CDIO Initiative (Conceive Design Implement Operate), an educational framework that stresses engineering fundamentals
- Chief information officer (CIO), or chief digital information officer (CDIO)
- Chief digital officer (CDO), or chief digital information officer (CDIO)
