= CDIO Initiative =

Educational framework

CDIO are trademarked initials for Conceive Design Implement Operate. The CDIO Initiative is an educational framework that stresses engineering fundamentals set in the context of conceiving, designing, implementing and operating real-world systems and products. Throughout the world, CDIO Initiative collaborators have adopted CDIO as the framework of their curricular planning and outcome-based assessment. The CDIO approach uses active learning tools, such as group projects and problem-based learning, to better equip engineering students with technical knowledge as well as communication and professional skills. Additionally, the CDIO Initiative provides resources for instructors of member universities to improve their teaching abilities.

== Concept ==
The CDIO concept was originally conceived at the Massachusetts Institute of Technology in the late 1990s. In 2000, MIT in collaboration with three Swedish universities — Chalmers University of Technology, Linköping University and the KTH Royal Institute of Technology — formally founded the CDIO Initiative. It became an international collaboration, with universities around the world adopting the same framework.

CDIO collaborators recognize that an engineering education is acquired over a long period and in a variety of institutions, and that educators in all parts of this spectrum can learn from practice elsewhere. The CDIO network therefore welcomes members in a diverse range of institutions ranging from research-led internationally acclaimed universities to local colleges dedicated to providing students with their initial grounding in engineering.

The collaborators maintain a dialogue about what works and what does not and continue to refine the project. Determining additional members of the collaboration is a selective process managed by a Council comprising original members and early adopters.

The CDIO revised syllabus consists of four parts:

1. Disciplinary knowledge and reasoning
2. Personal and professional skills and attributes
3. Interpersonal skills: teamwork and communication
4. Conceiving, designing, implementing, and operating systems in the enterprise, societal, and environmental context

The following institutions collaborate in the CDIO initiative:

Australia

- Chisholm Institute, Centre for Integrated Engineering & Science
- Curtin University
- Queensland University of Technology
- RMIT University
- University of Sydney
- University of the Sunshine Coast

Brasil

- USP
- Universidade de São Paulo-Escola de Engenharia de Lorena USP-EEL
- EStadual Paulista UNESP- Faculdade de Engenharia e Ciências do campus de Guaratinguetá FEG
- Centro Universitário Salesiano de São Paulo (UNISAL)
- Instituto Militar de Engenharia
- Universidade Federal de Santa Maria
- Centro Universitário do Estado do Pará - CESUPA

Belgium

- Hogeschool Gent
- Group T - International University College Leuven

Canada

- École Polytechnique de Montréal
- Queen's University, Ontario
- Sheridan College
- University of Calgary
- University of Manitoba

Chile

- Catholic University of the Holy Conception
- University of Chile
- University of Los Lagos
- University of Santiago, Chile

China

- Beijing Institute of Petrochemical Technology
- Beijing Jiaotong University
- Chengdu University of Information Technology
- Shantou University
- Suzhou Industrial Park Institute of Vocational Technology
- Tsinghua University
- University of Electronic Science and Technology of China
- Yanshan University

Colombia

- ICESI University
- National University of Colombia
- Pontifical Xavierian University
- University of Antioquia
- University of Santo Tomas
- University of Quindío

Denmark

- Aalborg University
- Aarhus University
- Technical University of Denmark

Finland

- Lahti University of Applied Sciences
- Lapland University of Applied Sciences
- Metropolia University of Applied Sciences
- Novia University of Applied Sciences
- Savonia University of Applied Sciences
- Seinäjoki University of Applied Sciences
- Tampere University of Applied Sciences
- Turku University of Applied Sciences
- University of Turku

France

- CESI group
- IMT Atlantique

Germany

- Ernst-Abbe-Hochschule Jena
- Hochschule Wismar, University of Applied Sciences Technology, Business and Design
- RWTH Aachen University

Honduras

- Universidad Tecnológica Centroamericana UNITEC

Iceland

- Reykjavík University

India

- Vel Tech University

Indonesia

- Politeknik Negeri Batam

Ireland

- Trinity College, Dublin
- University of Limerick

Israel

- Afeka Tel Aviv Academic College of Engineering
- Sami Shamoon College of Engineering

Italy

- Politecnico di Milano

Japan

- Hokkaido Information University
- Kanazawa Institute of Technology
- Kanazawa Technical College
- National Institute of Technology, Anan College
- National Institute of Technology, Kisarazu College

Malaysia

- Ungku Omar Polytechnic
- Ibrahim Sultan Polytechnic
- Taylor's University
- Universiti Teknologi MARA

Mongolia

- Mongolian University of Science and Technology

Netherlands

- Hague University of Applied Science
- Faculty of Aerospace Engineering, Delft University of Technology
- University of Twente

New Zealand

- University of Auckland

Norway

- Norwegian University of Science and Technology
- Østfold University College

Philippines

- Bulacan State University
- University of Science and Technology of Southern Philippines
- Batangas State University

Poland

- Gdańsk University of Technology

Portugal

- Instituto Superior de Engenharia do Porto

Russia

- Astrakhan State University
- Bauman Moscow State Technical University
- Cherepovets State University
- Don State Technical University
- Kazan Federal University
- Moscow Aviation Institute
- Moscow Institute of Physics and Technology
- National Research Nuclear University MEPhI
- North-Eastern Federal University
- Orel State University
- Saint Petersburg State University of Aerospace Instrumentation
- Siberian Federal University
- Skolkovo Institute of Science and Technology
- Tomsk Polytechnic University
- Tomsk State University of Control Systems and Radioelectronics
- Ural Federal University

Singapore

- Nanyang Polytechnic
- Singapore Polytechnic

South Africa

- University of Johannesburg
- University of Pretoria

South Korea

- Inje University

Spain

- Universitat Politecnica de Catalunya
- Technical University of Madrid

Sweden

- Blekinge Institute of Technology
- Chalmers University of Technology
- Jönköping School of Engineering
- Kristianstad University
- Linköping University
- Linnaeus University
- Luleå University of Technology
- Royal Institute of Technology
- Umeå Institute of Technology
- University of Skövde
- University West

Taiwan

- Feng Chia University

Thailand

- Chulalongkorn University (Faculty of Engineering)
- Rajamangala University of Technology Thanyaburi

Tunisia

- École supérieure privée d'ingénierie et de technologie

Turkmenistan

- Oguz han Engineering and Technology University of Turkmenistan

United Kingdom

- England
  - Aston University
  - Lancaster University
  - Nottingham Trent University
  - University of Bristol
  - University of Chichester
  - University of Hertfordshire
  - University of Leeds
  - University of Leicester
  - University of Liverpool
- Scotland
  - University of Strathclyde
- Northern Ireland
  - Queen's University Belfast
  - South Eastern Regional College
  - Ulster University

United States of America

- Arizona State University
- California State University, Northridge
- Duke University
- Embry-Riddle Aeronautical University
- Massachusetts Institute of Technology
- Naval Postgraduate School
- Pennsylvania State University
- Stanford University
- U.S. Naval Academy
- University of Arkansas
- University of Colorado
- University of Michigan
- University of Notre Dame-College of Engineering

Vietnam

- Dalat University
- Duy Tan University
- Vietnam National University, Ho Chi Minh City
- Vinh University

== Literature ==
CDIO currently has two guide books: Rethinking Engineering Education and Think Like an Engineer.

== Sources ==
- Edward Crawley; Johan Malmqvist; Sören Östlund; Doris Brodeur (2007). Rethinking Engineering Education, The CDIO Approach. Springer. ISBN 978-0-387-38287-6.

== See also ==
- Technology enhanced active learning
