= Awad Alasmari =

Saudi academic

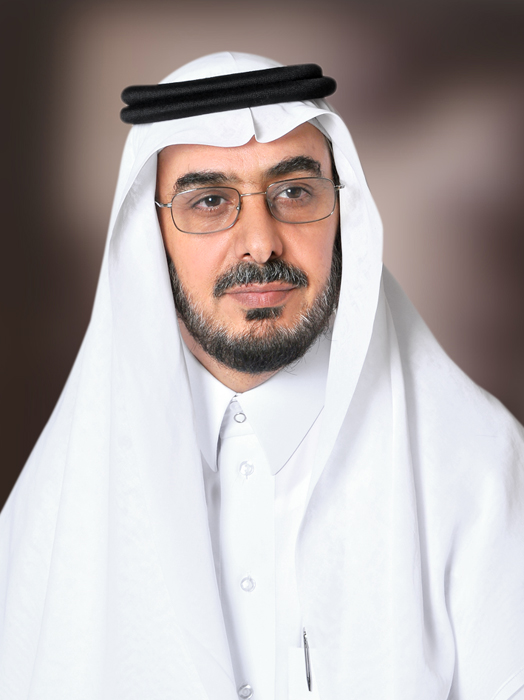
His Excellency Prof. Awad Kh. Alasmari

His Excellency Professor Awad bin Khuzeim Bin Ali Al-Asmari (Awad Khozam Alasmari) (Arabic: -- عوض بن خزيم بن علي الأسمري born in 1959 in Balasmer, Saudi Arabia) is a Saudi professor of electrical engineering. He served as Rector of Shaqra University since 2016 to August 2020.

== Early life and education ==
Awad Alasmari (or Awad Khozam Alasmari) was born in a small village of Balasmer in Saudi Arabia. Alasmari started his basic education from a government school in the village of Balasmer in Asir Region of Saudi Arabia. He was fond of reading since he was a young child. After completing his secondary education, he proceeded to the Department of Electrical Engineering at King Saud University and earned his Bsc in Electrical Engineering degree. Al-Asmari joined the same department as a teaching assistant that catapulted his career as an academician.

Al-Asmari moved to the United States and earned his Msc (1986) and PhD (1991) degrees at Ohio State University and University of Toledo, respectively. His doctorate education was sponsored by a scholarship grant from King Saud University.

== Career history ==
After completing his PhD, he resumed his work at King Saud University as assistant professor in the Department of Electrical Engineering, College of Engineering, where he continued teaching and conducting research which is reflected in the number of publications in his CV.

He got gradual promotions as associate professor and then professor of electrical engineering.

After being promoted as a professor, he was appointed as dean of the College of Engineering at Al-Kharj between 2007 and 2009 with additional responsibilities as the head of the Research Center and IT Unit at AL-Kharj. As a dean, he was keenly involved in various activities that included course and curriculum design, recruiting faculty members, formation of research center at al Kharj, forming student's clubs, alumni unit, mentoring students at different levels, and the like.

After working as, dean of the College of Engineering at Prince Sattam bin Abdulaziz University, Al-Asmari was promoted as Vice-Rector for Graduate Studies and Research.

== Research and publications ==
As an academician and a professor, Al-Asmari's inclination towards research and publication is natural; he successfully published scholarly articles in respected journals and conferences around the globe.

Al-Asmari is highly interested in scientific research. During the period of 2007 to 2009, he applied for a research grant in NANO technology and his proposal was accepted by King Abdulaziz City for Science and Technology(KACST). Under this project, he carried out experiments in NANO technology in collaboration with highly professional team.

== Vice Rector for Graduate Studies and Research ==
At Prince Sattam Bin Abdulaziz University Professor Awad got promoted as Vice-Rector for Graduate Studies and Research. The Deanship of Scientific Research directly came under this vice-rectorate and he took positive steps to build the university library. Also due to his inclination towards scientific research, constructive steps were taken that gave encouragement to the faculty members of the university.

There was a co-operation agreement between Prince Sattam Bin Abdulaziz University and University of California Irvine (UCI). Within the scope of this agreement, many students visited UCI campus and demonstrated their skills by completing their research projects in UCI campus. An academic cooperation and exchange agreement between the College of Sciences and Humanitarian Studies of Prince Sattam bin Abdulaziz University and Kyoto University's Graduate School of Agriculture.

Graduate School of Agriculture hosts "Kyoto Study Program" for faculty and students from Prince Sattam bin Abdulaziz University (8-12 June 2015) A graduate joint program agreement was established between Quebec University Canada and PSAU. In those programs, students complete their MS and PhD after meeting the admission criteria set by Quebec University.

== Elevation to Shoura Council ==
In 2013, King Abdullah Bin Abdulaziz Al Saud announced new Shoura members to be included in Shoura Council. Al-Asmari was selected as Shoura member by King Abdullah

As a shoura member, he proposed amendment in the regulations to combat cyber crimes. The proposed amendments include imprisonment for a maximum period of 10 years and fines with a ceiling of 10 million SAR for anyone who promotes terrorist thought or organizations, publishes or transmits material that threatens public safety or religious values, or harms the State interests or reputation. Shoura Council, reformed its specialized sub-committees. He was selected as Vice Chairman of the Transport, Communications and Information Technology Committee on December 8, 2015.

== His views on monitoring social media ==
Shoura Council member Awad Al-Asmari says social media is a security hazard for all citizens and that the state has the right to monitor these networks on the condition that it doesn't breach the privacy of people.

== Appointment as Rector of Shaqra University ==
In October 2016, Al-Asmari was appointed as the rector of Shaqra University in the excellent rank by royal decree issued by King Salman Bin Abdulaziz Al Saud. Since then Al-Asmari served as rector of Shaqra University up to August 2020 located in the city of Shaqra, Saudi Arabia.

Achievements / Tasks completed at Shaqra University

Cooperation Agreement Between Qiyas and Shaqra University To Establish Computerized Test Centers

Criticism Over Reply to Student in an Open Session at Shaqra University

Prof. Awad faced a lot of criticisms over his response to a student's question in an open question forum between students and the university rector. A student posed a question stating that he do not see much Saudi teachers in the university and his answer to his question faced lot of criticisms both positive and negative.
