= Jönköping School of Engineering =

Engineering school in Jönköping University, Sweden

Coordinates: 57.7786°N 14.1637°E

- Tekniska Högskolan i Jönköping
- Type: Foundation
- Established: 1994
- Affiliations: EUA
- President: Ingrid Wadskog
- Administrative staff: 150
- Students: 2600
- Doctoral students: 37
- Location: Jönköping, Sweden
- Website: http://www.ju.se/jth

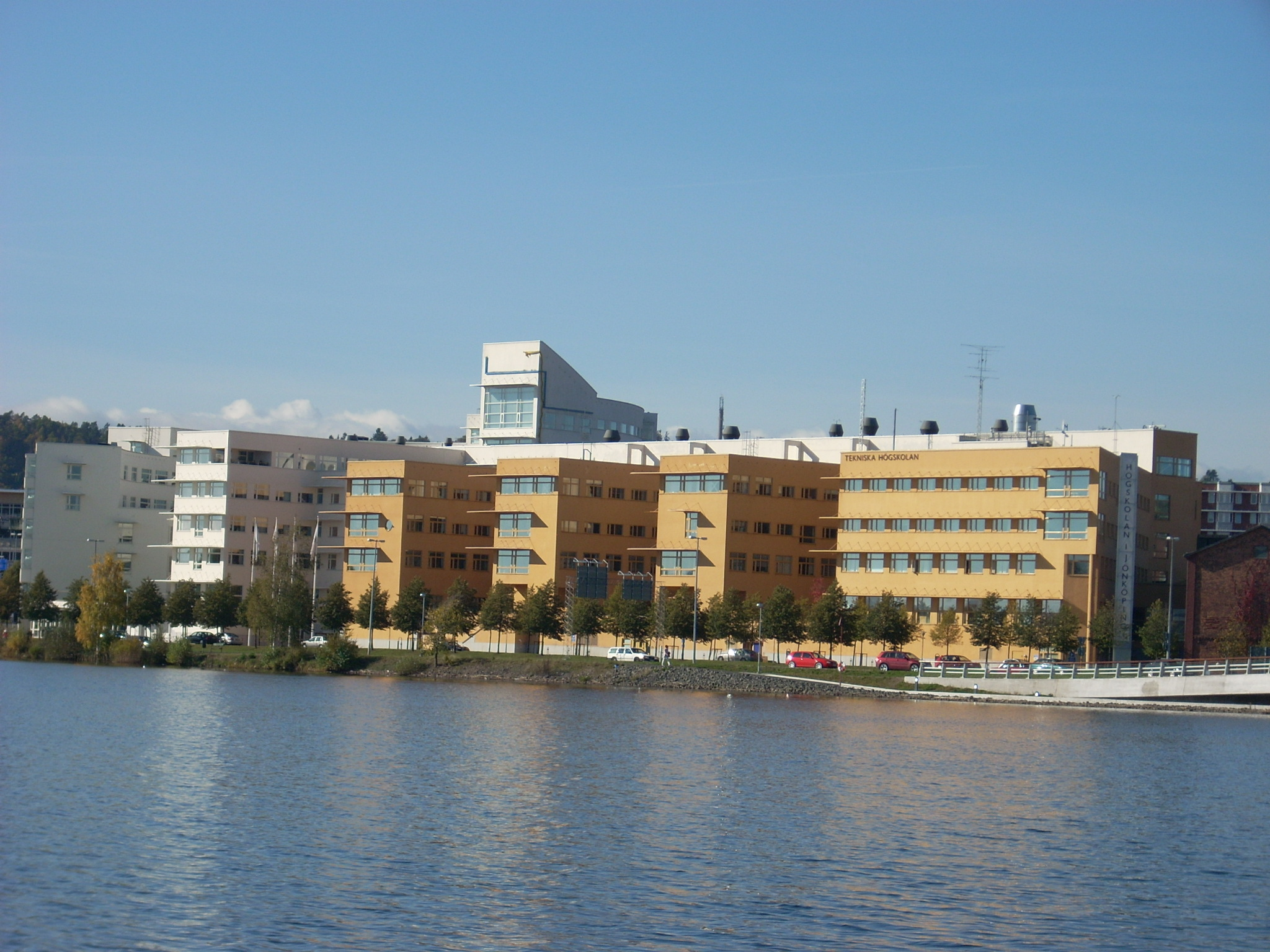

The Jönköping School of Engineering is one of four schools which form Jönköping University. The School of Engineering was formally established in 1994 but has a history that dates back to 1975. In 2006 about 2,500 students attend the school. Jönköping University has about 11,500 students. It is the third largest such school in Sweden. The school is also a member of the CDIO Initiative, which is an educational framework to conceive and develop a new vision of engineering education and for producing the next generation of engineering leaders. The pioneer institution in this collaborative effort was MIT in Boston.

== Programmes ==
The School of Engineering offers various undergraduate and graduate programs in English and Swedish. The Bachelor of Science programmes are given in Civil Engineering, Computer Engineering, Electrical Engineering, Industrial Engineering and Management and Mechanical Engineering majors. Master of Science programmes can be found in informatics, production systems and product development majors. The University Diploma degree programmes last for two years and are open to Swedish students.
