= Technology-enhanced active learning =

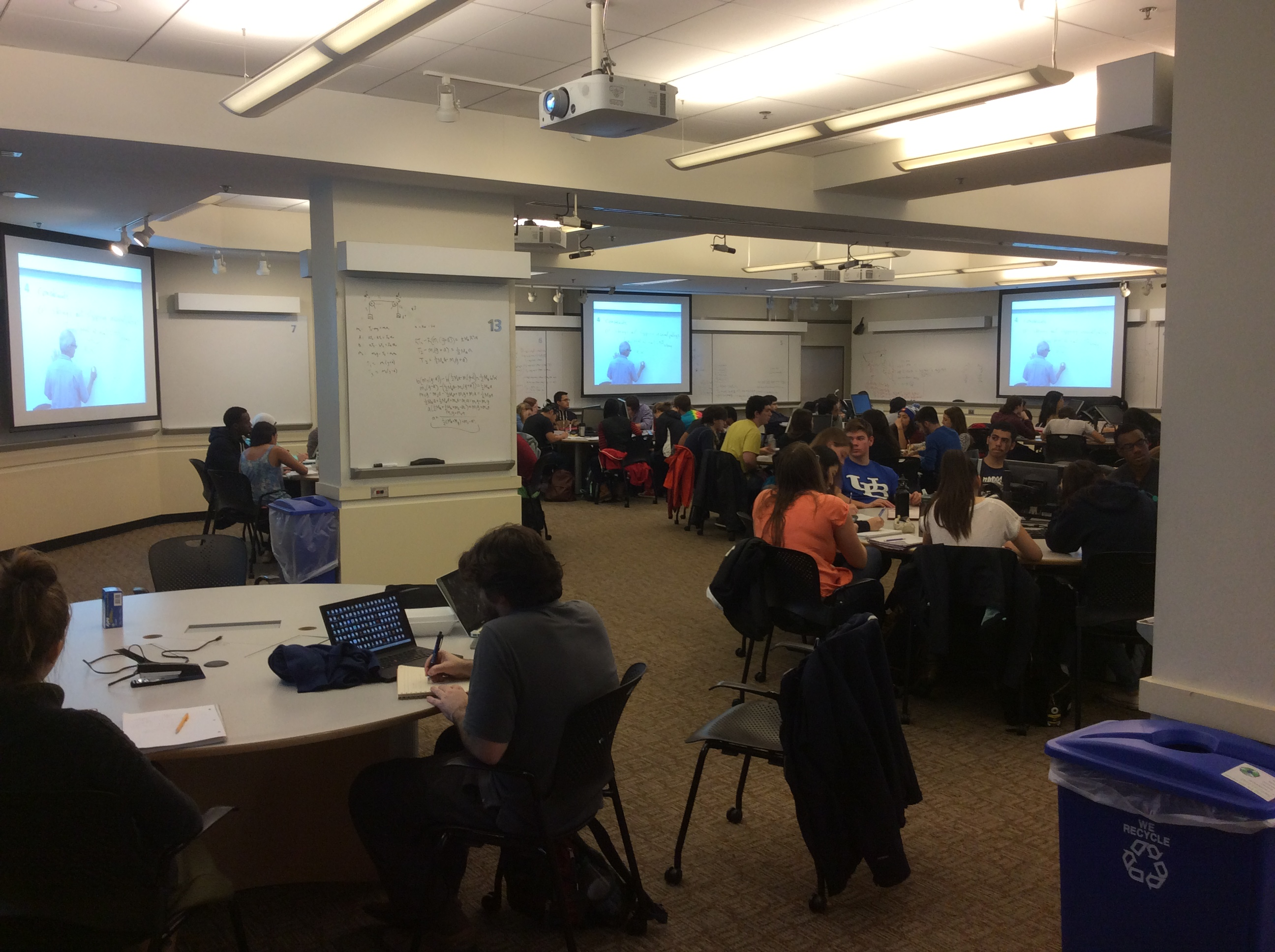
MIT technology-enhanced active learning (TEAL) classroom

Technology-enhanced active learning, or TEAL, is an alternative method of teaching that MIT pioneered. Led by Professor John Belcher, the TEAL approach showed that it was possible to challenge the passive or recitation style of teaching, common in large classes and re-enforced by lecture halls architecture. Despite having excellent math results, many first-year students had not transitioned across to the way lecturers teach and 40% of students dropped out of first year physics education at MIT. The TEAL approach set out to assist students to "visualize, develop better intuition about, and conceptual models" of scientific concepts.

== Situated model for teaching with technology ==
The TEAL approach, alternately referred to as Studio Physics, eschewed the traditional university lecture, which encouraged passivity. Using a collaborative active learning approach, students would sit in groups of nine around 13 tables, where they were expected to complete problem-solving activities, refer to laptop computers and then project their own solutions on a screen and compare the results with their peers.

== History ==
The TEAL alternative was based on a pedagogical model that was instituted at Rensselaer Polytechnic Institute by Jack Wilson in 1994. Since the TEAL approach had a robust assessment component, the implementors were able to understand the students perspective on the learning environment. Class attendance was a key component of the course, and students had to see this as a profitable use of their time.

== Current use and future directions ==
In 2014 TEAL+x, emerged, a combination between the TEAL format with MITx. The TEAL approach is currently in use at the Rensselaer Polytechnic Institute, North Carolina State University, University of Colorado, Harvard University, and the University of Maryland. The biggest lesson from this model is that robust assessment effort need to accompany educational innovations right from the start, and that all academics need to be inducted into the methodology. Studies have shown that TEAL significantly improves student learning outcomes. For instance, assessments comparing TEAL students to those in traditional lecture-based course revealed that TEAL students achieved approximately twice the average normalized learning gains across various academic levels. Additionally, failure rates dropped from about 13% in traditional formats to less than 5% in TEAL classes.

== See also ==
- Active learning
- CDIO Initiative
- SCALE-UP
