= Duy Tan University =

University in Vietnam

Coordinates: 16.0601°N 108.2097°E

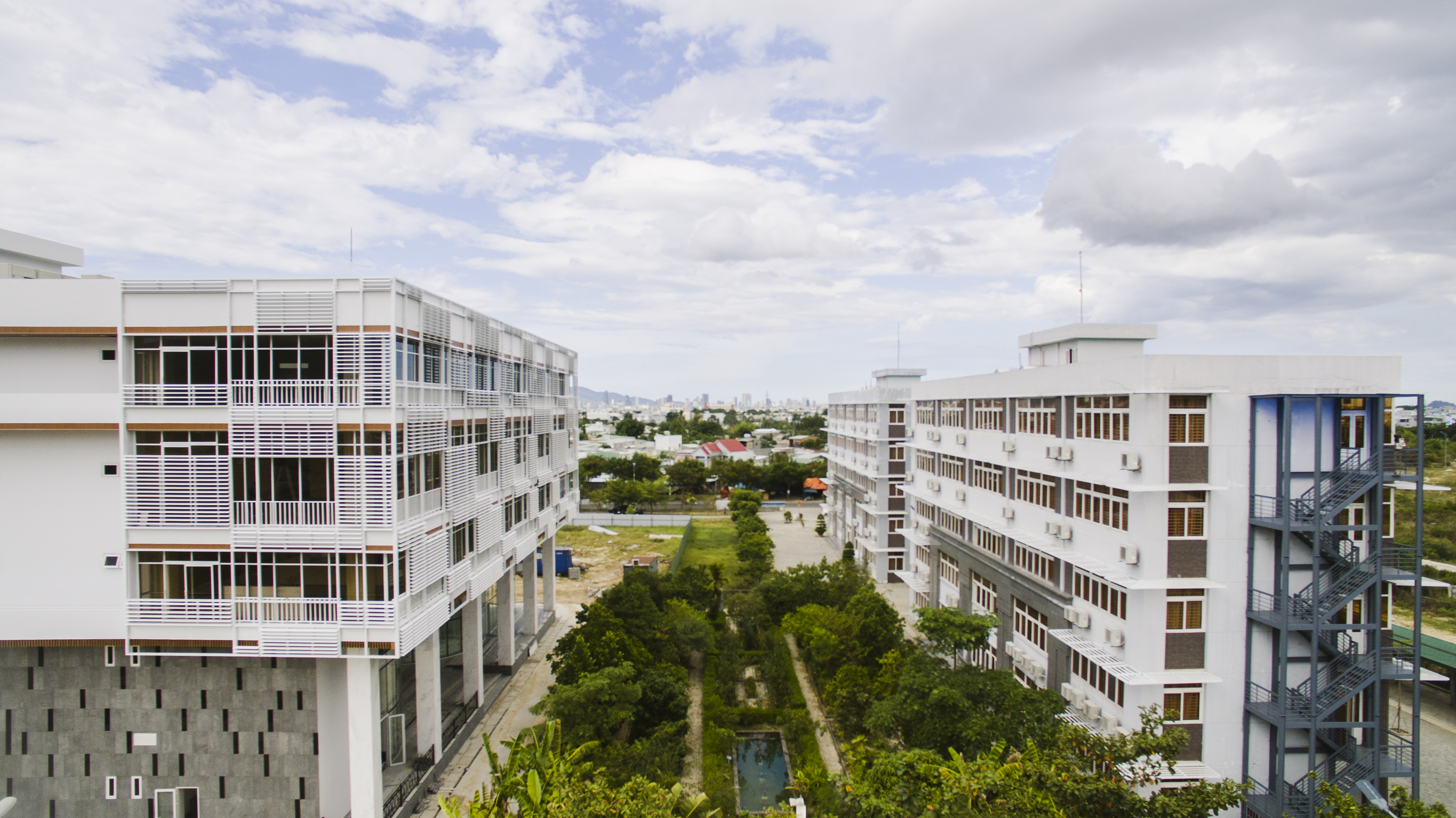
- Duy Tan University in 2019
- Motto: "We Do Everything for Student Rights and Future Careers"
- Type: Private university
- Established: 1994
- President: Lê Công Cơ
- Administrative staff: 800
- Students: 20,000
- Location: Da Nang, Vietnam
- Campus: 36 hectare
- Colors: Dark red-brown
- Mascot: (graduated) Stork
- Website: www.duytan.edu.vn
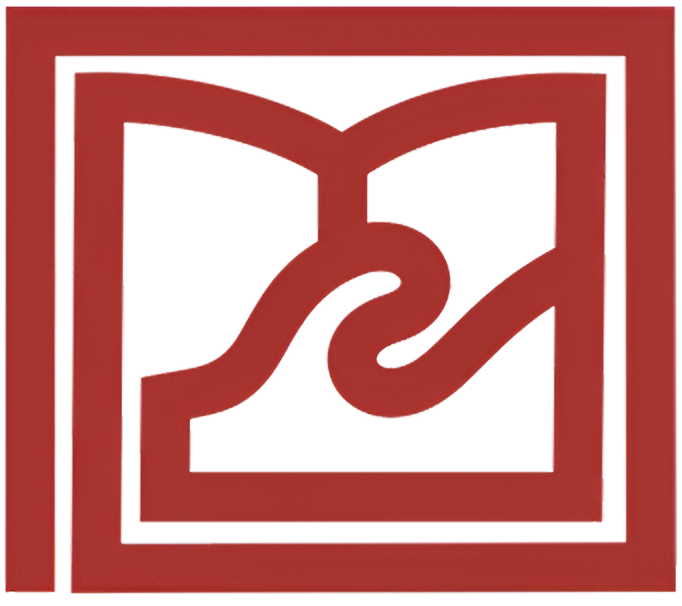

Duy Tân University (Vietnamese: Đại học Duy Tân) is a private research university in Da Nang, Vietnam. The name derives from the Modernisation Movement, or phong trào Duy Tân, of 1906–1908. In 2019, the school was awarded the "First Class Labor Medal" ("Huân chương Lao động hạng Nhất").

Duy Tân University cooperates with many international universities and in 2023/2024 appears in globally/internationally university rankings as the highest ranked Vietnamese university.

== Programmes ==
DTU was established on 11 November 1994, under Decision No 666/TTg, signed by the Prime Minister of Vietnam. DTU offers academic programs that include a graduate two year master's degree, an undergraduate four to five year bachelor's degree, a Junior Technical College three year Associate bachelor's degree and Secondary Professional and Vocational Education two year diplomas.

Duy Tan University offers a wide range of academic programs. Through its 16 graduate courses, DTU has fueled the local labor market with a total of 45,000 graduates and postgraduates so far.

In addition, with the slogan: "Partnering with Giants", Duy Tan University has expanded partnerships with many well-known universities around the world. These include Carnegie Mellon University (CMU), one of the top four American universities in IT; Pennsylvania State University (PSU), one of the top fifty universities in Business Management and Hospitality and Tourism; and California State University, CSU Fullerton and Cal Poly, one of the top five American public universities in Civil Engineering and Architecture on the West Coast.

By providing access to internationally standardized curricula, DTU has established programs to help students continue their studies abroad. More choices are now available for DTU students, such as the 2+2 program, the 1+1+2 program and the 3+1 program. In 2017, DTU partnered with Troy University and Keuka College in the US to offer students Onsite Study-Abroad programs in four disciplines: Business Administration, IT, Hotel Management and Financial Management. Students can now receive advanced education and graduate with internationally accredited degrees, without having to leave Vietnam.

== Founding ==
Le Cong Co, Le Phuoc Thuy and Nguyen Thi Loc met on 15 August 1992 to form a committee to campaign for the establishment of the "Private University of Central Vietnam." Le Cong Co was elected to head the committee.

Their mission included:

- Initiating administrative procedures and preparing legal documents, including the University Development Plan, University Operation Regulations and University Personnel Plan, for the establishment of the Council of University Founders.
- Implementing tasks, such as setting up the University Representative Office and preparing academic facilities for operation, once the University Establishment License was officially granted.
- Searching for candidates to join the Council of University Founders.

== Faculty ==
Faculty	Introduction
Information Technology	The faculty was founded at the foundation of Duy Tan University in 1994. The job placement ratio of graduates is almost 100% within six months of leaving DTU.
Hospitality & Tourism	In the tourist city of Danang, the faculty had 1,500 students in 2011.
Electrical Engineering	The faculty has an enrollment of around 400. The department has received investment and support in the development of its robotics and FPGA laboratories from the Board of Provosts and the DTU Center of Electrical Engineering.
Accountancy	Starting with 200 students in 1995, the faculty has grown to become the biggest at Duy Tan University, with 3,500 students enrolled in 2012.
Natural Sciences	The faculty is one of the few departments at DTU that does not offer a degree program. The faculty manages general education courses in Mathematics, Physics, Chemistry and Biology for the Faculty of Medicine and the Faculty of Pharmacy.
Architecture	The Architecture program of Duy Tan University was the "first of a kind" of private institution in Central Vietnam. It is known for its high-quality training, small class size and high mentor-to-student ration.
Political Science	The faculty does not offer a degree program. It focuses on the education of political theory and doctrine as well as the history of political science.
Environmental Engineering	The faculty has been involved in local and international environmental projects with local authorities and international NGOs from the United States, the Netherlands and Singapore.
Foreign Languages	Founded at the same time as Duy Tan University.
Business Administration	The faculty was established in 1995, and is the second largest department at Duy Tan University, with over 2,500 students. The faculty uses teaching and training methodologies, such as Project-Based Learning, case studies, digital simulations, and ERP-based training.
Humanities and Social Sciences	The faculty was established in 2007 to provide "the foundations of humanities" for DTU, as signified in the original academic doctrine of DTU. As well as its focus on literature, journalism, international relations and tourism, the department also helps teach humanities and social skills through general education courses.
Civil Engineering	Founded in 1997, the faculty is a human resource provider for the local construction industry. DTU civil engineering students are known for their numerous second and third place awards at the National Loa Thanh competition in Danang as well as the thousands of hours they spend doing volunteer and charity work in the city.
Medicine	The faculty was founded in 2009, offering the first bachelor's degree programs in Nursing in Danang. Together with the Faculty of Pharmacology, these two departments are expected to merge to form the first medical school in Danang.
Nursing	In 2009, the Ministry of Education and Training authorized DTU to offer a university level Bachelor of Nursing degree as part of the Faculty of Medicine and Pharmacy. As enrollment increased, the Faculty of Nursing was split off in November 2013 and began to offer a General Nursing major. Up to now, the faculty has graduated one thousand Bachelors of General Nursing and many now hold important positions in medical facilities in Danang and elsewhere.
Pharmacology	The faculty is the newest DTU department, established on 15 March 2012. The Faculty of Pharmacology and the Faculty of Medicine, have formed partnerships with two of the biggest local hospitals, the Danang General Hospital and the Veterans Hospital No.117 to secure internships and employment opportunities for the Nursing and Pharmacology graduates.
The International School	Since its inception on 19 January 2009, the DTU International School has signed agreements with Pennsylvania State University (PSU) and California State University (CSU) for the importation of the latest curricula and teaching methodologies in the fields of Business Administration, Finance and Banking, Hospitality and Tourism, Architecture and Civil Engineering. The DTU International School has enrolled almost 2,000 students, becoming the largest international school in Central Vietnam and the most advanced program in Vietnam.
The Vocational School	The school offered professional high-school diploma programs in 12 training programs between 2000 and 2011. Over the course of 10 years, the Vocational School graduated 11,000 students to work in industries in the region.
The Graduate School	The Graduate School of DTU was established in May 2009, offering a Master's program in Business Administration and in Information Technology. Master of Accountancy and Civil Engineering programs were added in 2010 and 2013. DTU expects to receive permission from the Ministry of Education and Training to offer Doctoral programs by mid-2013.

== Campus ==
Duy Tan University has six campuses; four are in the heart of Da Nang city with a total area of 12,000 m^{2} (five campuses of 30 hectares). Situated halfway between the north and the south of Vietnam, DTU is accessible from Hanoi, Ho Chi Minh City (Sai Gon), and other regions of Vietnam by road, rail, and air.

- 03 Quang Trung, Hai Chau District, Danang city: About 500 meters from the Han River, it was officially opened in March 2009, at a cost of 100 billion VND. This is one of the biggest educational facilities in Danang.
- 137 Nguyen Van Linh, Thanh Khe District, Danang City: This is the first campus of Duy Tan University and was officially used in November 1997. The building has five floors with an area of 1,800 m2. It is in the planning phase of the management board to use it as a training center of Danang Technology Institute with the contributions of many leading Vietnamese professors around the world.
- 254 Nguyen Van Linh, Thanh Khe District, Danang: First opened in September 2002, the building has 12 floors with a total of 5,000 m^{2}. It has offices of DTU departments, such as Business Administration, Accounting, the DTU International School, the DTU e-Learning Center, the NIIT Center, the Graphics Center, and the Study Abroad Center.
- 209 Phan Thanh, Thanh Khe District, Danang City: With an area of more than 4,500 m^{2}, this campus was first put to use in September 2001. The building is mainly used for teaching, laboratory work and as administrative offices for the Informatics Center and the Olympia Foreign Language Center.
- South Hoa Khanh Precinct, Lien Chieu District, Danang City: Officially opened in January 2011, it is the largest Duy Tan University campus, with an area of 35,200 m^{2}. The campus is about 1.5 km from the Thanh Binh beach to the east and near the bus station to the south. Together with three lecture halls for 1,000 students, the campus has a series of laboratories for Architecture and Civil Engineering students.
- Hoa Cam Campus

== International relations ==
Resolving its strategic objective of international collaboration, DTU has partnered with more than fifty universities worldwide, participated in many well-known international organizations and expand relationships with big international enterprises operating in Viet Nam. These lay a sound foundation for DTU to gain more and more impressive achievements in education and research.

– Collaboration to Exchange American Training Curricula

• In 2008, DTU collaborated with Carnegie Mellon University.

• In 2010, DTU partnered with Pennsylvania State University (PSU).

• In 2011, DTU collaborated with California State University, CSU Fullerton and Cal Poly, to implement the first and only advanced program in Architecture and Civil Engineering in Central Vietnam.

• In 2017, DTU signed an agreement with Purdue University to implement an advanced Electrical Engineering and Mechatronics program. DTU has partnered with Keuka College in the US to offer students the On-Site Study-Abroad programs in Business Administration; and with Troy University to offer the programs in Hotel Management and IT.

– Participation in CDIO, P2A (Passage to ASEAN)

• In 2012, DTU became the official member of CDIO Initiative.

• In 2012, The Passage to ASEAN – P2A was founded by Rangsit University (Thailand), DTU, the National University of Laos, Norton University (Cambodia) and the Myanmar Computer Institute.

== Academic achievements ==
University rankings

Global – Overall
- ARWU World: 901–1000 (2022)
- QS World: =482 (2026)
- THE World: 601–800 (2024)
- USNWR Global: =317 (2023)

Over the course of almost 25 years of operation and development, DTU students have achieved special academic accomplishments in their quest for knowledge and skill.

1. Best university in Information Technology.

2. The 2013, 2016 and 2017 CDIO Cups

3. The Asia – Pacific IDEERS Championship in 2014.

4. First prizes in the 2016 and 2017 National Microsoft Imagine Cup.

5. A win in the 2016 and 2017 National Go- Green- In – The – City.

6. Fourth place in the 2016 International Information Security Competition, held in Switzerland.

7. Dang Xuan Nam came first in the Loa Thanh Civil Engineering and Architecture Tournament in 2010.

8. Eight first prizes, seven second, fourteen third and seven consolation prizes in the National Student Festival of Architecture.

9. Nguyen Thu Quynh won a National award for Female Information Technology students in 2012.

10. The "January Star" Awards organized by the Vietnamese Student Association.

11. Ta Ba Thanh Huy won first prize in the 2008 National Informatics College Olympiads.

12. Many other awards in the National Mathematics, Informatics and Physics College Olympiads.

13. Big prizes in the 2014, 2016 and 2017 Computer Fireworks Competitions.

== Scandals ==
The university was also related to a number of scandals that became known to the public.

- Authors claiming to be from the university weren't on the personnel list of the university faculty staff.
- Lecturer fired for making false statements about the COVID-19 epidemic
- Violations in the use of workers and lecturers
- Unfair practices when competing for student admissions
