= Vel Tech Rangarajan Dr. Sagunthala R&D Institute of Science and Technology =

University in Chennai, India

- Other name: Vel Tech University
- Type: Deemed University
- Established: 1997; 29 years ago
- Founder: Dr. R. Rangarajan
- Accreditation: Naac A++
- Academic affiliations: UGC, MHRD
- Chairperson: Dr.Rangarajan Mahalakshmi K
- Chancellor: R. Rangarajan
- Vice-Chancellor: Prof. Rajat Gupta
- Location: No.42, Avadi-Vel Tech Road, Vel Nagar, Avadi, Chennai, Tamil Nadu, Tamil Nadu, India; 13.189458°N 80.106381°E
- Campus: 66.75 acres (27.01 ha); Suburban
- Website: veltech.edu.in

Vel Tech Rangarajan Dr. Sagunthala R&D Institute of Science and Technology, formerly known as Vel Tech Dr. R. R. & Dr. S. R. University and commonly referred to as Vel Tech, is a private institute located in Avadi, Chennai, Tamil Nadu. It offers undergraduate, postgraduate and Doctoral programmes in engineering and technology, in addition to a Master of Business Administration. It consists of four other campuses such as the Multi Tech, High Tech, And the Arts and Science.

== History ==
Vel Tech was established in 1997 by Dr. R. Rangarajan and Dr. Sagunthala Rangarajan as an engineering college affiliated to the University of Madras, with courses in computer science & engineering, electronics & communication engineering and electrical & electronics engineering. From 2001 the college was affiliated to Anna University. The college was recognised as a deemed-to-be-university in 2008.

== Accreditation ==
In November 2014 Vel Tech received Tier I accreditation from the National Board of Accreditation for its aeronautical and mechanical engineering undergraduate programs. In December 2015 the university was accredited with an "A" grade by the National Assessment and Accreditation Council. law. In February 2023, the university was accredited with an "A++" grade (the highest grade) by the National Assessment and Accreditation Council. law.

Vel Tech was ranked 87 among the engineering colleges National Institutional Ranking Framework (NIRF) in 2022. Naac A++ .Recognised as category 1 Deemed to be university by the university grants commission.

== Academic activities ==
Vel Tech has adapted the new pedagogical process called "Conceive-Design-Implement-Operate" (CDIO) approach. CDIO imbibed syllabus helps the students to acquire professional, personal and inter-personal skills systematically.

== Location ==
Vel Tech has a campus of about 66.75 acres (27.01 ha). The campus is located in the Outer Ring Road in West Chennai, Avadi.

== Academics ==
Academic programmes are offered in engineering, management, media technology and law.

The Choice Based Credit System (CBCS) gives student's flexibility to choose the course of their choice and learn at their own pace. CDIO methodology is also practiced in the curriculum. The Institution is the first member from India to implement and practice CDIO methodology.

- School of Sciences and Humanities
- School of Computing
- School of Electrical and Communication
- School of Mechanical and Construction
- School of Management
- School of Commerce
- School of Law
- School of Media Technology & Communication
