= Lokman I. Meho =

- Born: 1968- Beirut, Lebanon
- Occupations: Professor and University Librarian at the American University of Beirut
- Spouse: Chahnaz Ali
- Children: Jomerd Alexander Meho (2010); Roni Daniel Meho (2011)

Academic background
- Education: American University of Beirut; North Carolina Central University; The University of North Carolina at Chapel Hill; Georgetown University, Washington, DC

Academic work
- Discipline: Bibliometrics; Research Assessment; University Rankings; Research Awards
- Notable works: Research Integrity Risk Index (RI²)
- Website: https://sites.aub.edu.lb/lmeho/ri2/

Lokman I. Meho (Arabic: لُقمان مِحّو) is a Lebanese-American academic and a leading figure in the field of bibliometrics. One of his most notable achievements is the development of the Research Integrity Risk Index (RI²), a framework designed to assess institutional-level vulnerabilities in research integrity. The RI² is regarded by many experts as a potentially transformative tool in the realms of scholarly publishing and university ranking, offering a new framework for evaluating the ethical foundations of research environments.

== Education ==
The academic journey of Lokman Meho began at American University of Beirut (AUB), where he earned a B.A. in 1991 and an M.A. in 1996, both in Political Science. That same year, he graduated summa cum laude with an M.S. in Library Science from North Carolina Central University (USA). Building on this foundation, Meho pursued a Ph.D. in Information and Library Science at the University of North Carolina at Chapel Hill, which he completed in 2001. In 2022, he obtained a Certificate in Higher Education Management from Georgetown University in Washington, DC.

== Roles in Academia and Librarianship ==
Lokman Meho began his career as a Teaching Fellow at the University of North Carolina at Chapel Hill from 1997 to 2001, followed by a faculty position at the University at Albany, State University of New York, where he served as Lecturer (2001) and Assistant Professor of Library and Information Science (2002–2004).

He then joined Indiana University Bloomington (2004–2009), where he got promoted to Associate Professor of Library and Information Science (2008) and received tenure (2009). In 2009, he moved to the American University of Beirut (AUB), where he served as University Librarian and Associate Professor of Political Studies until 2021. From 2021 to 2023, he served as Director of the Library at Georgetown University in Qatar (GU-Q).

He returned to Beirut to serve as University Librarian with an academic appointment as Full Professor in the Department of Internal Medicine, Division of Basic and Clinical Research, as well as affiliation with the Clinical Research Institute. At AUB, he has led initiatives to align library services with institutional research priorities and global rankings, while continuing to provide bibliometric services to guide strategic planning, research investments, and faculty performance assessment.

== Contributions to Research ==
Meho's scholarly journey began with an interest in how people search for and use information in an increasingly digital world. His early studies focused on the information-seeking behavior of social scientists, resulting in a model that combined cognitive and contextual factors to explain how disciplinary environments influence the discovery, evaluation, usage, and management of information. This work demonstrated that access to information alone does not fully explain how knowledge is utilized; context, culture, and institutional setting also play significant roles.

Around the same time, his study on email interviewing helped establish it as a credible and effective method for collecting qualitative data, long before online interviewing became standard practice. He aimed to show that technology can enhance participation and flexibility in research without compromising rigor.

As digital infrastructures became central to scholarly communication, he began analyzing databases themselves. His comparison of Google Scholar, Scopus, and Web of Science has become one of the most-cited works in the field, revealing how differences in indexing affect citation counts, visibility, and research evaluation. Later, his studies on the h-index and other performance indicators clarified how metrics shape academic hierarchies, promotion decisions, and reputations. These projects demonstrated that information systems are not neutral; they influence what and who is recognized as valuable within the global research community. That insight guided his later work on the structural and ethical dimensions of research assessment, a topic central to modern librarianship, scholarly communication, and open science.

== Institutional Systems, Gender, and the Role of Metrics ==
Over time, his focus shifted from individual researchers to the institutions that produce and evaluate knowledge. This shift took shape when he was appointed University Librarian at AUB. This position allowed him to connect his research on metrics and evaluation with the real-world challenges of academic librarianship and higher education.

Working closely with the senior administrators, he helped integrate bibliometric analyses into promotion, tenure, hiring, benchmarking, and strategic planning. This experience taught him that publication and citation-based metrics are never neutral; they reflect the values and incentives of institutions. While powerful tools for improvement when used responsibly, these metrics could profoundly distort priorities if applied without critical context.

During this period, he conducted a large-scale bibliometric analysis of computer science conferences, extending evaluation beyond journals to reflect the publication culture of the field. He also studied gender disparities in science, revealing persistent imbalances in recognition and visibility across STEM fields. These studies drew attention to structural biases in the distribution of credit and prestige, informing policy discussions on equity and representation.

Collaborating with colleagues across the university, particularly in medicine, health sciences, nutrition, and business, he co-authored several bibliometric studies addressing pressing issues in medical, health, and business research. These collaborations produced comparative analyses of mental health research during pandemics, inequities in research collaboration in conflict zones, and business and medical research productivity in the Arab region. These studies exemplify how bibliometric methods can inform institutional strategy, faculty development, and responsible research evaluation, directly aligning with the mission of academic libraries to foster equitable knowledge ecosystems.

In 2022, Meho's personal collection of papers and books was donated to the AUB University Libraries, and is kept in the Archives and Special Collections Department.

== The Research Integrity Risk Index (RI²): Concept, Methodology, and Impact ==
His experiences in university leadership crystallized the need for a new assessment tool, which led directly to the creation of his signature project: the Research Integrity Risk Index (RI²). RI² is a global framework that identifies systemic risks to research integrity by analyzing retraction rates, publications in delisted journals, and self-citation patterns. Rather than attributing misconduct solely to individuals, RI² conceptualizes integrity as a structural phenomenon shaped by incentives, governance, and evaluation systems. Its innovation lies in shifting the focus from measuring impact to measuring credibility and integrity, reimagining bibliometrics as a tool for improvement and governance rather than competition.

The framework has drawn wide international attention. It has been featured in Nature, Chemistry World, University World News, and numerous other international outlets, and even prompted Times Higher Education to publish a clarification of its own methodology. The RI² website has received more than 300,000 visits (via the WordPress platform alone), and its data are now used in institutional reviews and policy discussions across the Global South. Beyond academia, RI² has informed media coverage and public debate on research quality, ethics, and rankings, demonstrating how data transparency can strengthen public trust in science when metrics are used not only to reward output but also to reveal and correct structural problems. RI² is both a research instrument and a tool for public accountability.

== Recognition and Influence ==
- Trustees Teaching Award, Indiana University Bloomington, given in 2005 and 2006 in recognition of "excellence in classroom teaching".
- The 2007 DIALOG/ALISE Methodology Paper Competition. For "E-Mail Interviewing in Qualitative Research: A Methodological Discussion," Journal of the American Society for Information Science and Technology 57, no. 10 (August 2006): 1284-1295.
- OCLC/ALISE 2006 Library and Information Science Research Grant. For "Impact of Data Sources on Citation Counts and Rankings of LIS Faculty: Web of Science vs. Scopus and Google Scholar," by L. I. Meho and K. Yang, JASIST.
- ALISE's 2005 Bohdan S. Wynar Research Paper Competition. For "Ranking the Research Productivity of LIS Faculty and Schools: An Evaluation of Data Sources and Research Methods," by L. I. Meho and K. M. Spurgin, JASIST.

== Selected publications ==
Most of Meho's papers focus on evaluation and assessments of research, including bibliometrics, rankings, and research integrity. A full list of his publications, profile and metrics is available on his LinkedIn, Google Scholar, Scopus, and ORCID accounts.

=== Selected Journal Articles ===
- Meho, L. I. & Akl, E. A. (2025). Using bibliometrics to detect questionable authorship and affiliation practices and their impact on global research metrics: A case study of fourteen universities. Quantitative Science Studies.
- Meho, L. I. (2021). The gender gap in highly prestigious international research awards, 2001–2020. Quantitative Science Studies, 2(3), 976–989.
- Maalouf, F., Medawar, B., Meho, L. I., & Akl, E. A. (2021). Mental health research in response to the H1N1, Ebola, and COVID-19 outbreaks: a comparative bibliometric analysis. Journal of Psychiatric Research, 132, 198–206.
- Meho, L. I. (2025). Gaming the metrics: Bibliometric anomalies in global university rankings and the development of the Research Integrity Risk Index (RI²). Scientometrics, 130, 6683–6726.
- Meho, L. I. (2006). E-mail interviewing in qualitative research: A methodological discussion. Journal of the American Society for Information Science and Technology, 57(10), 1284-1295.
- Meho, L. I., & Tibbo, H. R. (2003). Modeling the information-seeking behavior of social scientists: Ellis's study revisited. Journal of the American Society for Information Science and Technology, 54(6), 570-587.
- Meho, L. I. (2019). Using Scopus's CiteScore for assessing the quality of computer science conferences. Journal of Informetrics, 13(1), 419–433.
- Abiad, M. G., & Meho, L. I. (2018). Food loss and food waste research in the Arab world: a systematic review. Food Security, 10(2), 311–322.
- El Rassi, R., Meho, L. I., Nahlawi, A., Salameh, J. S., Bazarbachi, A., & Akl, E. A. (2018). Medical research productivity in the Arab countries: 2007-2016 bibliometric analysis. Journal of Global Health, 8(2).
- Meho, L. I., & Rogers, Y. (2008). Citation counting, citation ranking, and h-index of human-computer interaction researchers: A comparison of Scopus and Web of Science. Journal of the American Society for Information Science and Technology, 59(11), 1711–1726.
- Meho, L. I*, & Yang, K. (2007). Impact of data sources on citation counts and rankings of LIS faculty: Web of Science versus Scopus and Google Scholar. Journal of the American Society for Information Science and Technology, 58(13), 2105–2125.
- Cronin, B., & Meho, L. (2006). Using the h-index to rank influential information scientists. Journal of the American Society for Information Science and Technology, 57(9), 1275–1278.

==== Dissertation ====
- Meho, L. I. (December 2001). The information-seeking behavior of social science faculty studying stateless nations. Ph.D. Chapel Hill, NC: The University of North Carolina. Advisor: Helen R. Tibbo.

== See also ==
- Scientific misconduct
- Citation Impact
- Bibliometrics
- Research Integrity Risk Index
