= National Commission for Academic Accreditation and Evaluation =

Academic accreditation organization in Saudi Arabia

- Abbreviation: NCAAA
- Predecessor: National Commission for Academic Accreditation and Assessment
- Formation: 2004
- Founder: Higher Education Council (now the Council of Universities' Affairs)
- Type: GO
- Purpose: academic accreditation
- Headquarters: Riyadh
- Location: Saudi Arabia
- Region served: Saudi Arabia
- Services: accreditation and quality assurance
- Parent organization: Education and Training Evaluation Commission
- Website: etec.gov.sa/en/ncaaa

The National Commission for Academic Accreditation and Evaluation (formerly Assessment; NCAAA) is an organ of Saudi Arabia's Education and Training Evaluation Commission that oversees the country's post-secondary school educational accreditation facility. It is an autonomous body but directly responsible to the Council of Universities' Affairs (formerly the Higher Education Council).

== History ==
The NCAAA was established in 2004. The NCAAA board of directors is drawn from government, institutions, and industry professionals.

== Services ==
The NCAAA provides services for individuals, government entities, and private entities. The services include programmatic accreditation, i.e., a recognition by the NCAAA that an academic program has met the organization's quality assurance and academic accreditation standards. The assessment covers a range of academic programs, including those covering health sciences.

Accreditation and quality assurance criteria

- Mission and Objectives
- Governance and Administration
- Management of Quality Assurance and Improvement
- Learning and Teaching
- Student Administration and Support Services
- Learning Resources
- Facilities and Equipment
- Financial Planning and Management
- Faculty and Staff Employment Processes
- Research
- Institutional Relationships with Community
