= Sami Shamoon College of Engineering =

Coordinates: 31.249861°N 34.788833°E

- המכללה האקדמית להנדסה ע"ש סָמִי שַמְעוּן
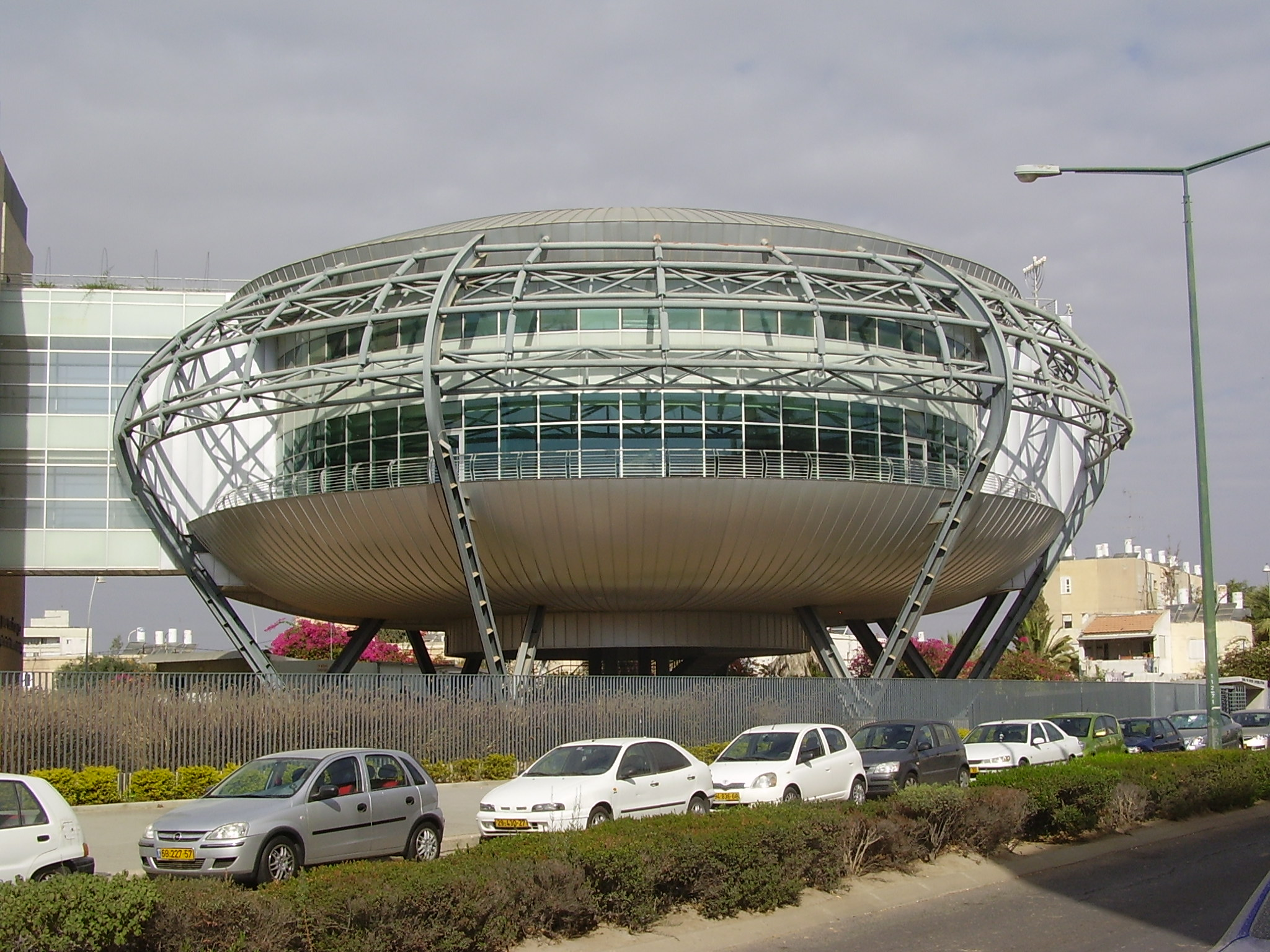
- Former names: Negev Academic College of Engineering
- Established: 1995
- President: Jehuda Haddad
- Students: 6,500
- Location: Beersheba and Ashdod, Israel
- Campus: Urban
- Website: sce.ac.il

Sami Shamoon College of Engineering (abbreviated SCE) is a college in Israel with campuses in Beersheba and Ashdod, focusing on STEM education. It was founded in 1995 in Beersheba and expanded into Ashdod in the 2000s. The college provides B.Sc. and M.Sc. programs and has over 6,500 students. The president since 2021 is Professor Semyon Levitsky.

== History ==
Sami Shamoon College of Engineering started out as part of a program to expand academic studies in Israel's geographic periphery. It was founded by faculty from Ben Gurion University, and originally named Negev Academic College of Engineering. The first curriculum was approved in 1994, and the college opened in 1995.

In 2004 the name was changed to Sami Shamoon, after a British-Israeli businessman who donated over US $10 million to the college.

In 2006, Ness Technologies opened a development center at the college.

In 2012 the college received permission to grant master's degrees. A Haredi-oriented five-year study program was inaugurated in 2013, which includes preparatory studies before starting the degree.

== Campuses ==
Sami Shamoon College is one of very few colleges in Israel that is not officially a university to have campuses in more than one city.

=== Beersheba ===
The Beersheba campus was designed by the architect Gershon Shevah and inaugurated in 2001. Shevah remains involved in the college's overall architectural planning, along with Haim Dotan.

=== Ashdod ===
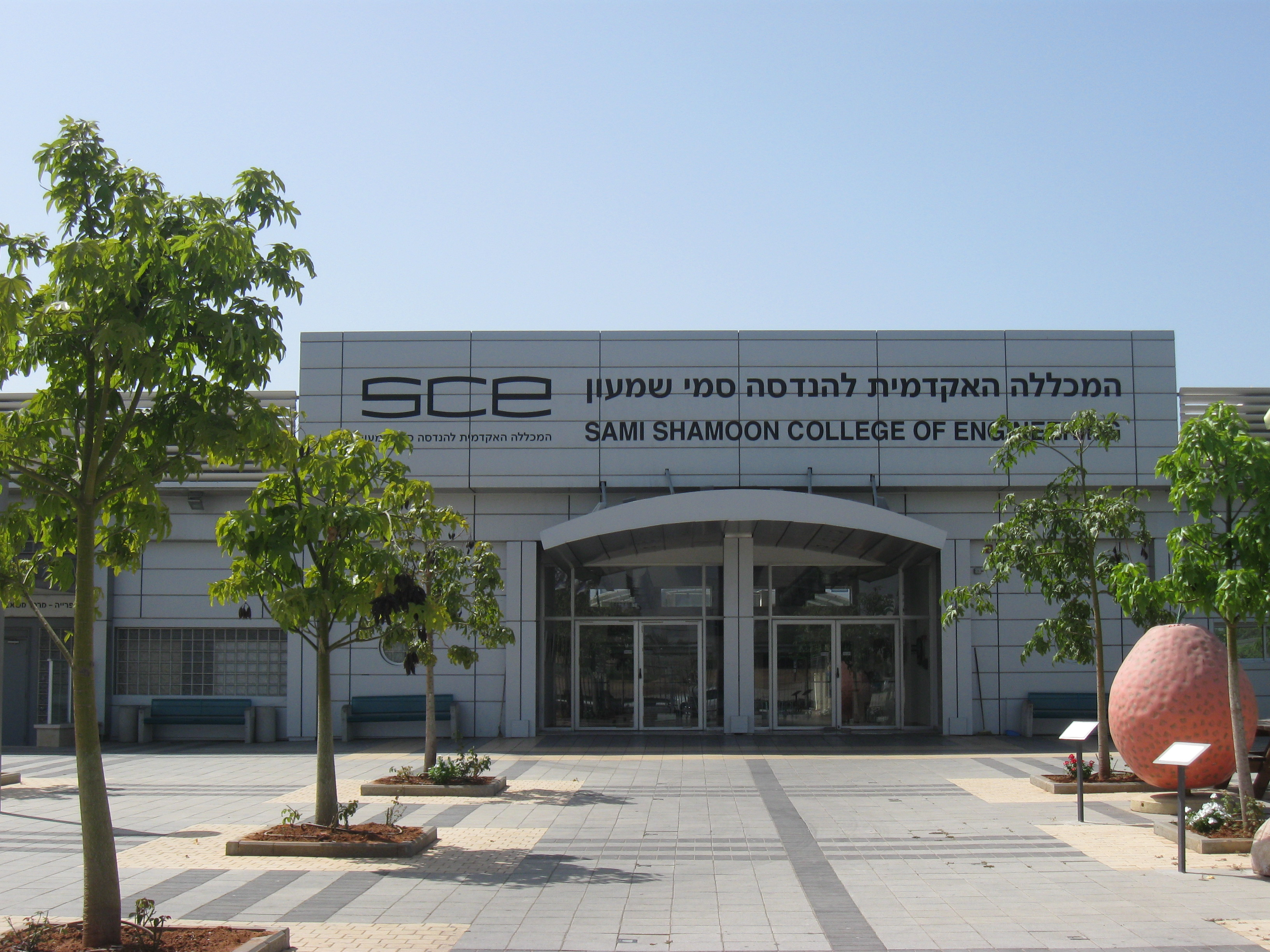
Ashdod campus

Government approval for the Ashdod campus was received in 2002.

== Departments ==
- Electrical engineering
- Chemical engineering
- Mechanical engineering
- Software engineering
- Industrial engineering and management
- Civil engineering
- Architecture
- Visual Communication

== SCE in the Israeli society ==
SCE takes an active role in empowering students from unrepresented groups in the Israeli society, such as Haredim, students from the social periphery, and Arabs, by giving dedicated scholarships, social programs, and additional financial support.
