= Ernst-Abbe-Hochschule Jena =

University of Applied Sciences Jena
- Type: public
- Established: October 1, 1991
- President: N.N.
- Academic staff: 120
- Students: app. 4,200
- Location: Jena, Germany
- Website: https://www.eah-jena.de/en/

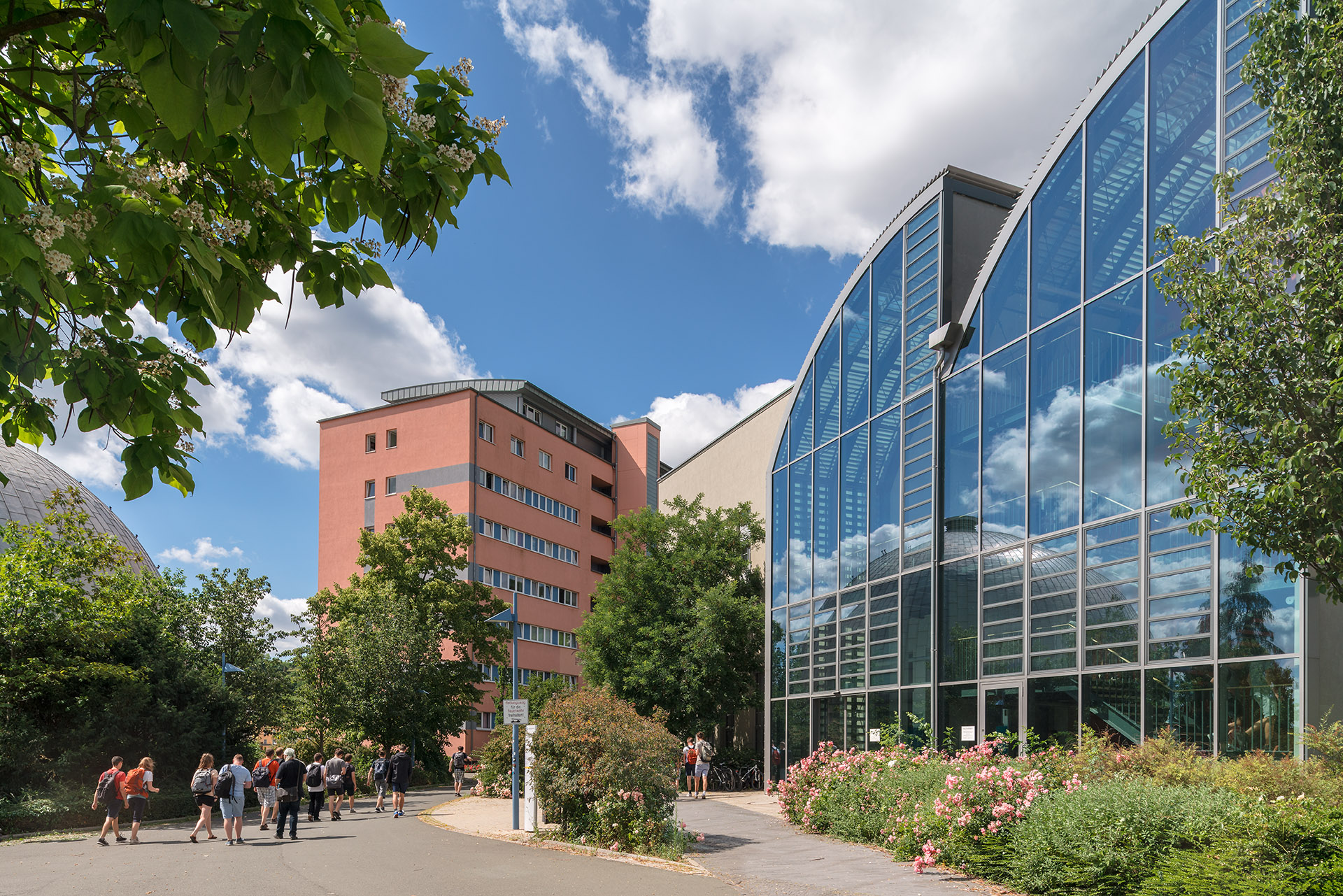
picture: Marcus Glahn

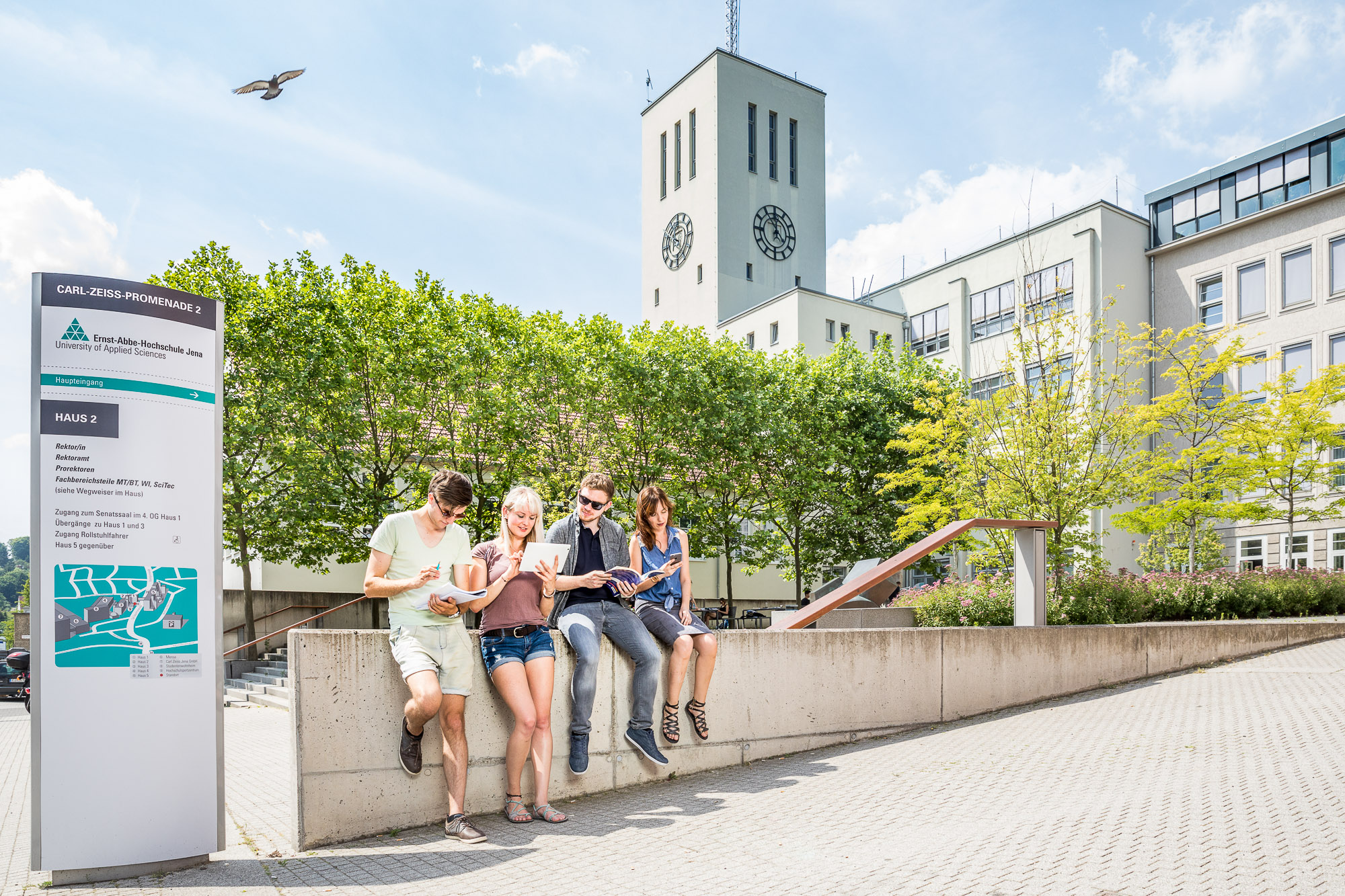
picture: Sebastian Reuter

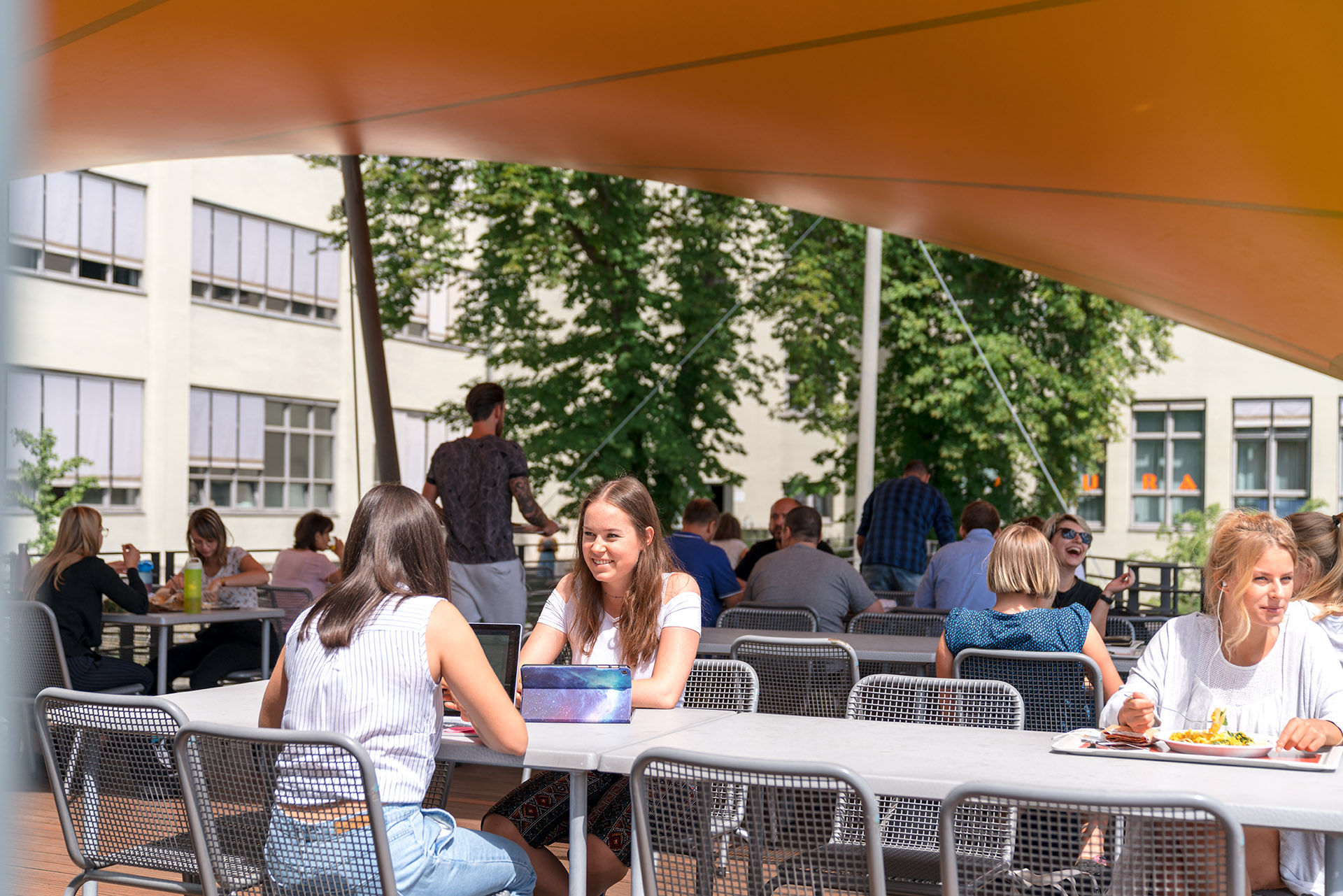
picture: Marcus Glahn

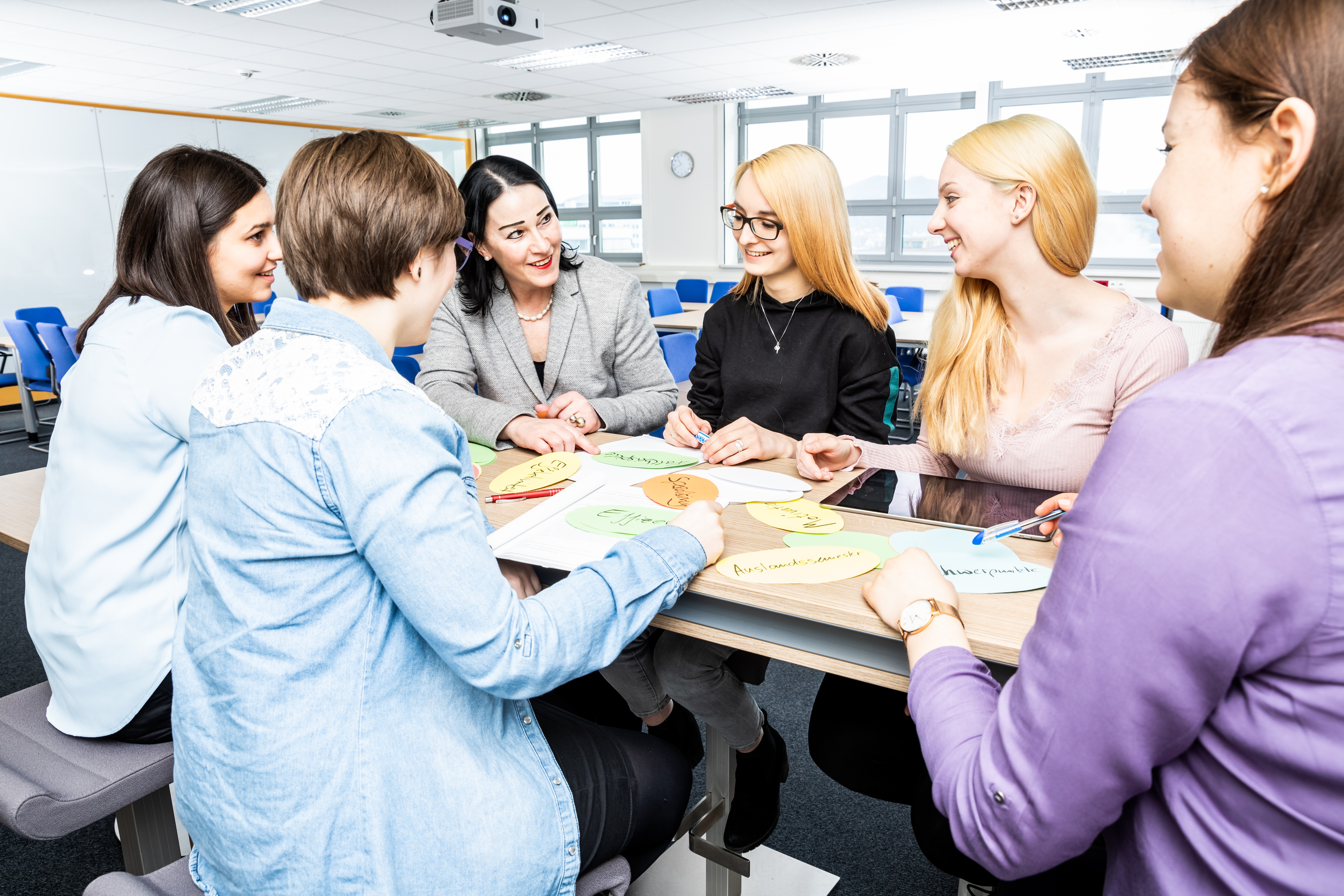
picture: Sebastian Reuter

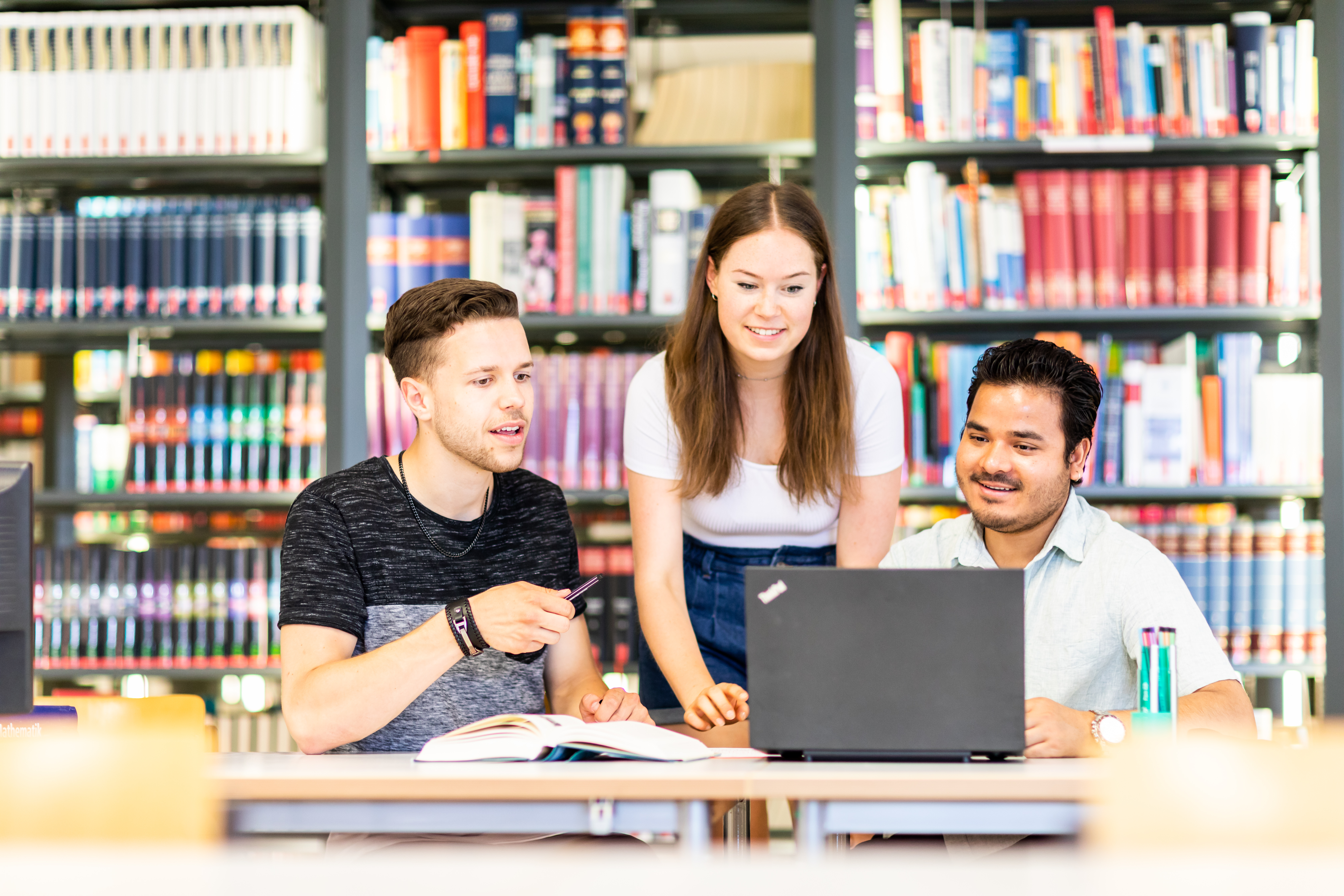
picture: Sebastian Reuter

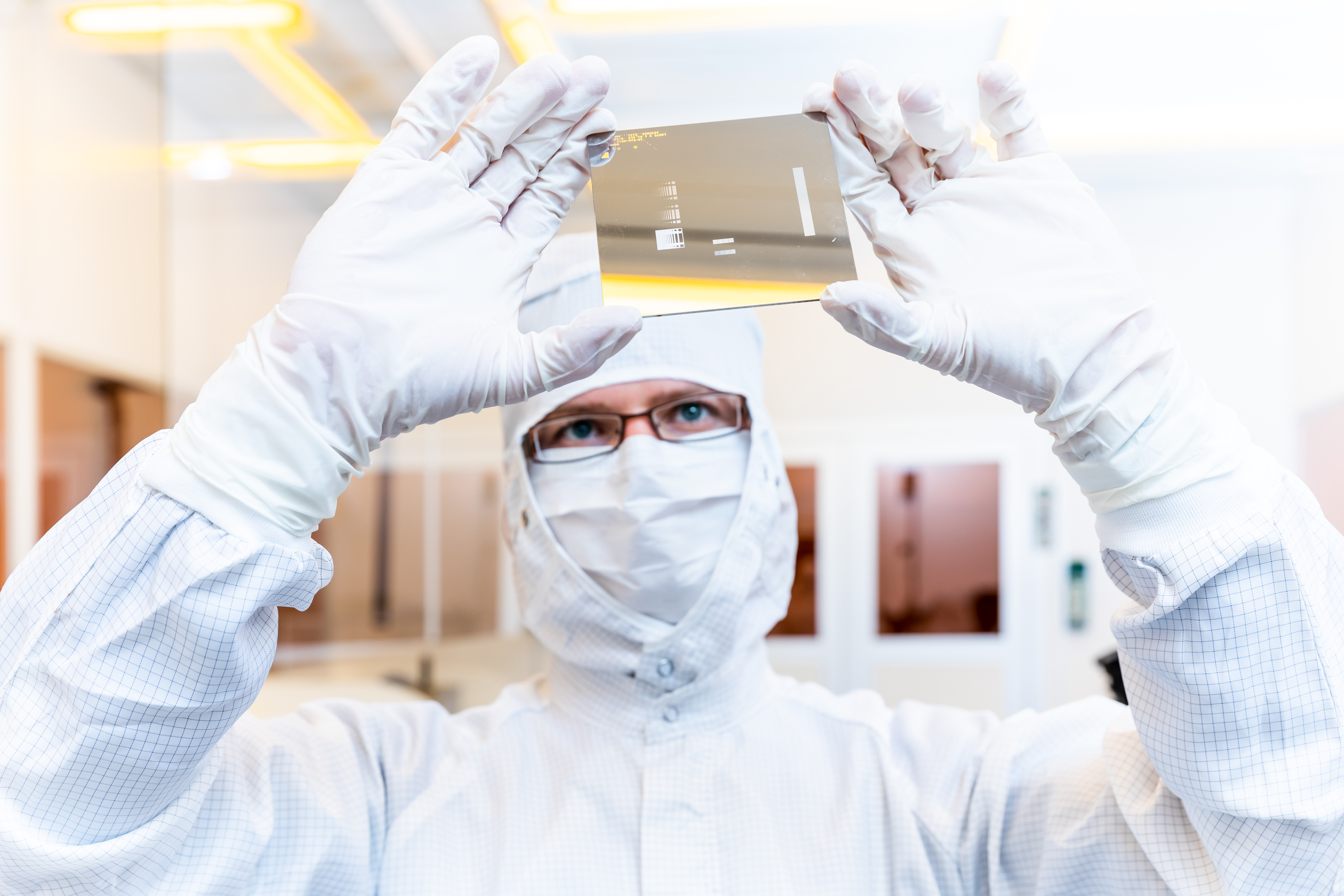
picture: Sebastian Reuter

University of Applied Sciences Jena (German: Ernst-Abbe-Hochschule Jena (short version: EAH Jena)) was founded on 1 October 1991 as one of the first institutions of higher education of its kind in the newly founded federal states of Germany. Their slogan is: ENABLING, MOVING, CREATING – TOGETHER.

== History and naming ==
During the trial operation in the winter semester 1991/1992, 272 students joined, and nowadays about 4,200 students are enrolled at the University of Applied Sciences Jena. After extensive renovation and redesign, at the end of 2001, all departments, the university administration as well as the central library with the patent and research site moved to the campus in the Carl-Zeiss-Promenade in Jena.

In the summer semester 2012, the Fachhochschule Jena was renamed to Ernst-Abbe-Fachhochschule Jena. Due to changes in the Higher Education Act in October 2014, an additional change of name followed. The new name Ernst-Abbe-Hochschule Jena intended to clarify the competences of the university in the areas of teaching and research.

The use of the name Ernst Abbe, a researcher, entrepreneur and social reformer, represents the University of Applied Sciences Jena fields of specialisation.

== Structure and Courses ==
The University of Applied Sciences Jena offers about 50 Bachelor's and Master's degree programs in the fields of technology, business, social affairs and health. They are all characterized by a very high practical relevance. The university ensures this in particular through its integration into various networks, the appointment of professors from industry as well as through project and research work, internships, excursions and theses with numerous cooperation partners. In addition, simulation games, case studies and practical lectures are integrated into the curriculum, interdisciplinary events are offered and coaching-based support services, such as those of the Career Service and the Start-up Service, are made available. The Bachelor's and Master's degree programs at University of Applied Sciences Jena meet high scientific standards and at the same time meet the practical requirements for specialists and managers of tomorrow.

The degree programmes are assigned to the following nine departments:

- Business Administration
- Electrical Engineering and Information Technology
- Fundamental Sciences
- Mechanical Engineering
- Medical Engineering and Biotechnology
- Health and Nursing
- SciTec (Science and Technology)
- Social Work
- Industrial Engineering

== Research, development and transfer ==
The research and development of University of Applied Sciences Jena includes four research priorities:

1. Precision Systems: Optics, measurement technology, sensor technology, aerospace electronics—fields closely linked to Jena as a technology hub
2. Technologies and Materials: Materials Research, Materials Science, Manufacturing Technology, Optical Technologies
3. Health and Sustainability: Medical Technology, Nursing Care, Sustainable System Solutions
4. Digitalisation: AI Applications, Digital Transformation, Industry 4.0

== International ==
The University of Applied Sciences Jena cooperates with numerous universities and research institutions worldwide. It thus promotes the exchange of students, scientists as well as ideas and know-how. The proportion of exchange students is rising continuously. Lecturers at University of Applied Sciences Jena also work temporarily at universities in Europe, Asia, Africa and America. This development is specifically promoted by numerous cooperation agreements. One focus of internationalisation is cooperation within the framework of the ERASMUS+ programme of the European Union. The proportion of international students is around 22%. Studying and internship abroad are integrated into the curriculum in some degree programs.

== Support for Graduate Students and Alumni ==
- Joint Doctoral Programs: Interested students have the opportunity to pursue a joint doctoral program. The university has contractual agreements with various other universities for this purpose.
- Alumni Network: Annual alumni gatherings provide opportunities for professional exchange and networking within the respective industry.
- Career Services and Startup Support: The university offers various counseling services to help students launch their careers.

== Campus ==
The campus of University of Applied Sciences Jena is located at Carl-Zeiss-Promenade in Jena, in the premises of Carl Zeiss AG. Located southwest of the city center of Jena, the university can be reached quickly. After refurbishment of the last building in October 2008 the campus with a size of 26,000 m^{2} has seven lecture halls, 124 laboratories and a total of 1,500 rooms. On the grounds of University of Applied Sciences Jena, the Studierendenwerk Thüringen operates two canteens and a dormitory. The library of the University of Applied Sciences Jena includes approximately 300,000 books, videos and CDs. Since June 1999, the University of Applied Sciences Jena has its own climatological station. The local climate is recorded and can be accessed on the Internet.
