= Education and Training Evaluation Commission =

Saudi government organization

Agency overview
- Jurisdiction: Government of Saudi Arabia
- Headquarters: Riyadh, Saudi Arabia
- Website: etec.gov.sa

The Education and Training Evaluation Commission (ETEC) (Arabic: هيئة تقويم التعليم والتدريب), formerly known as the Education Evaluation Authority, is a government organization responsible for planning, evaluation, assessment, and accreditation of educational and training systems in Saudi Arabia in coordination with the Ministry of Education.

Established in 2017 following the council of ministers’ decree No. 120, as a governmental entity, ETEC is independent both legally and financially and reports directly to the prime minister. The organization of the commission in its new entity was issued in 2019, in accordance with the council of ministers resolution No. 108 to strengthen its mission as a specialized authority to evaluate, measure, and accredit qualifications in the field of education and training for public and private sectors, as well as to raise their quality, efficiency, and their contribution to the service of the economy and national development in coherence with the kingdom's Vision-2030.

== Qiyas Tests ==
The Qiyas Tests are a set of college admission tests in Saudi universities belonging to ETEC. They include:

- Test general aptitude
- Test general aptitude for academics
- Test general aptitude in English
- Test grades science faculties - students
- Achievement test theory for colleges - students
- Acceptance of scientific disciplines - Students test
- Acceptance of theoretical disciplines - Students test
- Test skills in English
- Arabic language test for non-children
