= Salah al-Din (Riyadh) =

Salah al-Din صلاح الدين
- Neighbourhood
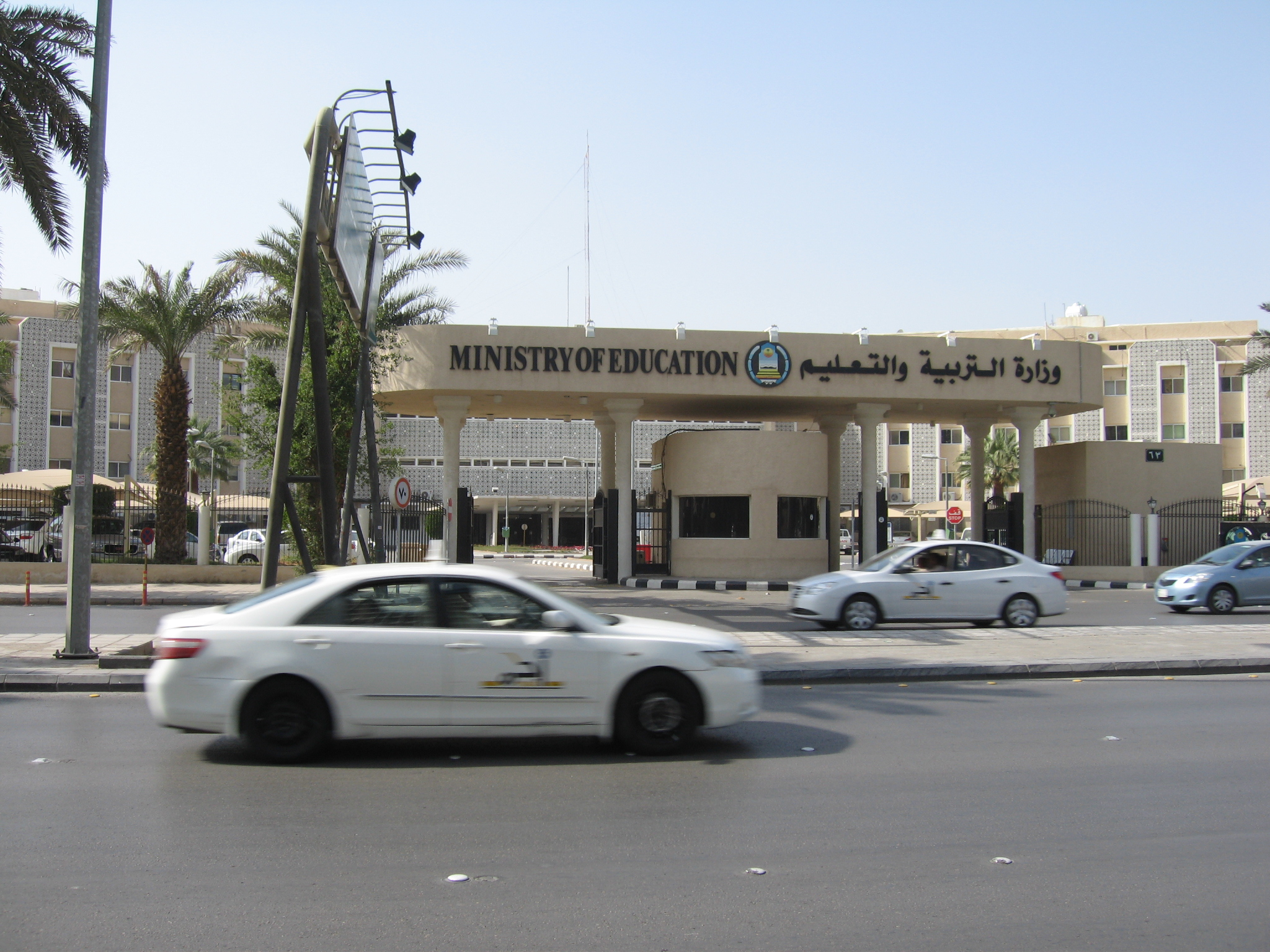
- Ministry of Education headquarters, 2011

- Location within Saudi Arabia
- Coordinates: 24°44′25″N 46°42′52″E
- Country: Saudi Arabia
- City: Riyadh
- Merged into King Salman Neighborhood: 2023
- Named for: Salah al-Din ibn Ayyub

Government
  - Body: Baladiyah al-Ulaya

Language
  - Official: Arabic

Salah al-Din (Arabic: صلاح الدين) was a neighborhood in northern Riyadh, Saudi Arabia, located east of al-Wahah and west of al-Wurud in the sub-municipality of al-Ulaya. The district was named after 12th century Muslim sultan Salah al-Din ibn Ayyub, the founder of Ayyubid dynasty. Along with the adjacent al-Wahah neighborhood, the district ceased to exist in May 2023 when both of them where conjoined to form the King Salman Neighborhood. Covering an area of almost 875 acres, it hosted the main office of the Ministry of Education and the premises of Riyadh College of Technology as well as Prince Sultan University.

It was renamed as King Salman Neighborhood by Saudi crown prince Mohammed bin Salman in May 2023 when it was conjoined with al-Wahah neighborhood to honor the legacy of King Salman bin Abdulaziz and his efforts to modernize Riyadh during his period in office as the governor of Riyadh Province between 1963 and 2011.

== Landmarks ==
=== Diplomatic missions ===
- Embassy of Ukraine
- Embassy of Mozambique

=== Mosques ===
- Umm Abdulaziz al-Theyab Mosque
- Salah al-Din Mosque

=== Marketplaces ===
- Tamimi Markets
- eXtra store

=== Institutes ===
- Riyadh College of Technology
- Prince Sultan University
- International Aviation Technical College

=== Government offices ===
- Ministry of Education
