= Study in Saudi =

Study abroad digital platform

- ادرس في السعودية
- Study in Saudi logo
- Founder: Ministry of Education
- Purpose: Facilitating admission for international students
- Website: studyinsaudi.moe.gov.sa

Study in Saudi (Arabic: ادرس في السعودية, Udrus fī as-Suʿūdiyyah) or Study in Saudi Arabia is an official multilingual digital platform developed by the Ministry of Education to facilitate the admission of non-Saudi students, including both residents of Saudi Arabia and international applicants, who wish to pursue higher education in universities and colleges across the Kingdom. The platform provides centralized access to information about institutions, academic programs, available specializations, and scholarship opportunities, including fully funded, partially funded, and paid options. It helps students apply and track their admission through an integrated online system that also facilitates Study Visa issuance in coordination with the Ministry of Foreign Affairs and other related sectors. Study in Saudi supports various academic tracks, including diploma, bachelor's, master's, doctoral, and postdoctoral programs, as well as opportunities for student exchange, training, and research visits. It is also one of the Ministry of Education's initiatives that contribute to achieving the goals of Saudi Vision 2030.

== About ==
The Study in Saudi platform was officially announced on 19 October 2022 during the 18th International Education Show at Expo Centre Sharjah in the United Arab Emirates. Its purpose is to centralize and simplify the application and admission processes, and to provide comprehensive academic and living information for international students considering study in Saudi Arabia. It is one of two Ministry of Education platforms for higher education admissions: Qabul, for Saudi nationals, and Study in Saudi, for non‑Saudi students, researchers, and trainees both inside and outside the country. The platform provides guidelines, conditions, and benefits regarding scholarships and educational visas in ten global languages: Arabic, English, French, Turkish, German, Hindi, Chinese, Hausa, Malay, and Urdu.

The application requires the following conditions:

- The applicant must be at least 16 years old.
- A valid passport must be provided.
- A medical report proving freedom from contagious diseases must be submitted.
- Certificates and official documents must be certified by the authorities specified by the educational institution.

== Scholarships ==
A scholarship is an academic seat awarded to a male or female non-Saudi student to study at higher education institutions in the Kingdom of Saudi Arabia, and an individual cannot apply for the same scholarship at the same academic level more than once. There are three types of scholarships:

Types of scholarships
Scholarship	Description	Eligibility criteria	Benefits
Fully funded scholarships	Full scholarships cover the entire cost of tuition and related academic fees for long-term educational visas. These scholarships apply to various fields of study and include all services provided by the university or educational institution. Additionally, financial assistance is offered to international students to support their living expenses.	These scholarships are awarded based on academic excellence, competence, and talent in various fields. Interested students must submit applications along with required documents, such as academic certificates and recommendation letters.	Provision of healthcare for the student and their family members if they are brought to reside with the student, according to applicable regulations.; A financial allowance granted upon the student's arrival in the Kingdom.; Housing accommodation during the study period.; Access to all benefits granted to other students at the educational institution.; Annual travel tickets for the student and their family members in accordance with relevant regulations.
Partial scholarships	Partial scholarships are available with both long-term and short-term educational visas. Students receive full benefits while being exempted from some tuition fees and other financial charges.		Provision of healthcare for the student and their family members if they are brought to reside with the student, according to applicable regulations.; A financial allowance granted upon the student's arrival in the Kingdom.; Housing accommodation during the study period.; Access to all benefits granted to other students at the educational institution.; Annual travel tickets for the student and their family members in accordance with relevant regulations.
Paid scholarships (Self-funded)	Self-funded study is available with both long-term and short-term educational visas, where students cover all tuition fees and related expenses.	Submitting an application and attaching the required documents, such as academic certificates and recommendation letters.	Provision of healthcare for the student and their family members if they are brought to reside with the student, according to applicable regulations.; A financial allowance granted upon the student's arrival in the Kingdom.; Housing accommodation during the study period.; Access to all benefits granted to other students at the educational institution.; Annual travel tickets for the student and their family members in accordance with relevant regulations.

== Study visa ==
The platform's services include applying for either long-term or short-term educational visas, which allow students, researchers, and trainees from outside Saudi Arabia to enter the country for study, research, or training purposes. Applicants can apply for and track the status of their visa applications directly through the platform, which is linked with the Ministry of Education, the Ministry of Foreign Affairs, and other relevant authorities. These visas are issued for specific purposes and come with defined conditions and benefits.

The educational visa differs from other types of visas in several ways:

- It facilitates the process of enrolling in educational institutions in Saudi Arabia.
- It does not require the student to have a sponsor upon arrival.
- It permits the student to bring their dependents.
- It allows the student to undertake practical training for up to two years after graduation.
- It permits part-time work during studies and full-time work during academic breaks.
- It grants the student's family visitor visas and enables family members to work in Saudi Arabia.

Types of Educational Visas
	Long-term Educational Visa	Short-term Educational Visa
Purpose of the Visa	Its purpose is to study, work, or conduct research in Saudi Arabia for a period exceeding one year, suitable for academic degrees such as bachelor's, master's, and doctoral programs.	Its purpose is to study, train, or participate in short-term programs in Saudi Arabia for a period not exceeding six months, suitable for language study, short-term programs, and student exchange programs.
Requirements for Issuance	The applicant must be at least 16 years old.; Submit a valid passport with at least six months validity from the intended date of entry to Saudi Arabia.; Obtain acceptance from a licensed and accredited educational institution in Saudi Arabia.; Provide proof of financial ability to cover tuition and living expenses or submit a financial guarantee.; Submit written consent from a guardian and accompanying persons for applicants under 18 years old.; Provide a medical report confirming freedom from contagious diseases.; Submit valid medical insurance for the visa holder and their dependents.; Demonstrate proficiency in the language of study, except for those applying to study Arabic language programs.	The applicant must be at least 16 years old.; Submit a valid passport with a minimum of six months validity from the intended date of entry to Saudi Arabia.; Obtain acceptance from a licensed and accredited educational institution in Saudi Arabia.; Provide proof of financial ability to cover tuition and living expenses or submit a financial guarantee.; Submit written consent from a guardian and accompanying persons for applicants under 18 years old.
Duration	One year, renewable annually.	Six months, extendable for an additional six months.

== Application procedure ==
The application process has specific deadlines that vary depending on the academic degree being applied for and the applicant's location, whether inside or outside Saudi Arabia. After submission, the application is reviewed by the chosen university. Upon the university's approval, the application is then processed by the Ministry of Education. There is a standardized application process to follow:

1. Create an account on the Study in Saudi platform
2. Choose the appropriate academic program
3. Receive an acceptance letter
4. Apply for the educational visa
5. Arrive in Saudi Arabia
6. Receive a reception at the airport
7. Attend the orientation program for international students (in coordination with the university)
8. Receive the class schedule
9. Begin studies

== See also ==
- National Center for Assessment in Higher Education
- Education and Training Evaluation Commission
