= King Salman Neighborhood =

King Salman Neighborhood حي الملك سلمان
- Neighbourhood
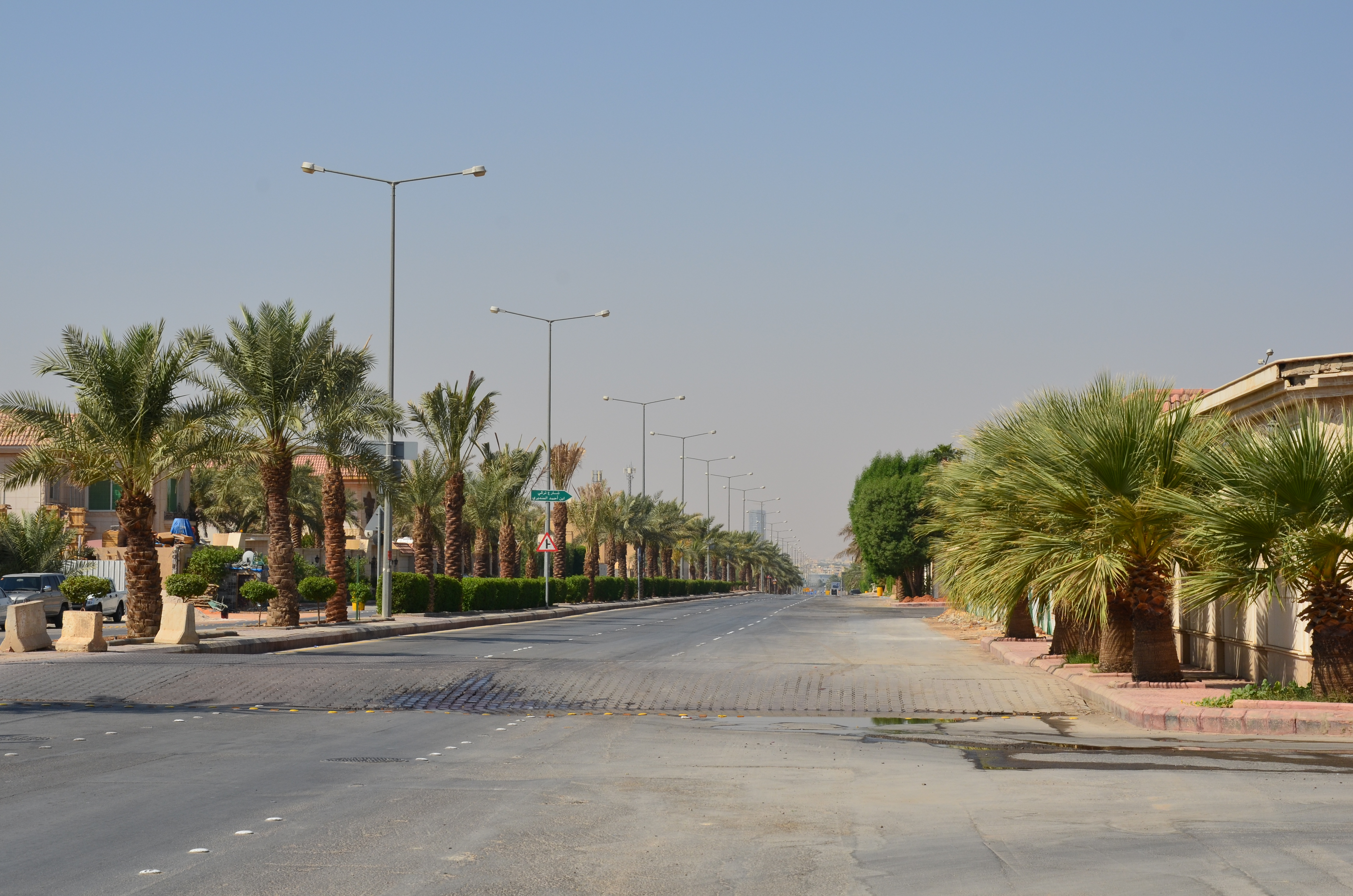
- Rafha Street, 2012

- Location within Saudi Arabia
- Coordinates: 24°44′25″N 46°42′52″E
- Country: Saudi Arabia
- City: Riyadh
- Established: 14 May 2023
- Founder: Mohammed bin Salman
- Named for: Salman bin Abdulaziz

Government
  - Body: Baladiyah al-Ulaya

Area
  - Total: 6.77 km^{2} (2.61 sq mi)

Language
  - Official: Arabic

King Salman Neighborhood (Arabic: حي الملك سلمان) is a district in northern Riyadh, Saudi Arabia, located east of King Abdullah District and west of al-Wurud neighborhood in the sub-municipality of al-Ulaya. Covering an area of 1673 acres, the district was formed in May 2023 and assumed its name after King Salman bin Abdulaziz following the amalgamation of al-Wahah and Salah al-Din neighborhoods. The neighborhood is located adjacent to the site of King Salman Park project.

In 2019, the Saudi government announced the King Salman Park project, a planned 4102-acre large-scale public park that was slated to be the largest urban park in the world. King Abdulaziz District was selected for the site of the project. King Abdulaziz District was situated south of al-Wahah and Salah al-Din neighborhoods.

In May 2023, al-Wahah and Salah al-Din neighborhoods were renamed as King Salman Neighborhood by Saudi crown prince Mohammed bin Salman to honor the legacy of King Salman bin Abdulaziz and his efforts to modernize Riyadh during his period in office as the governor of Riyadh Province between 1955 and 1960 and then from 1963 to 2011.

== Landmarks ==
=== Diplomatic missions ===
- Embassy of Ukraine
- Embassy of Mozambique

=== Mosques ===
- Ibn al-Uthaymin Mosque
- Fahd al-Owaidah Mosque
- Princess Juhaier bint Bandar Mosque
- Al-Wahah Mosque
- Umm Abdulaziz al-Theyab Mosque
- Salah al-Din Mosque

=== Parks ===
- Al-Wahah Park

=== Marketplaces ===
- Tamimi Markets
- eXtra store

=== Institutes ===
- Riyadh College of Technology
- Prince Sultan University
- International Aviation Technical College

=== Government offices ===
- Ministry of Education

== Gallery ==
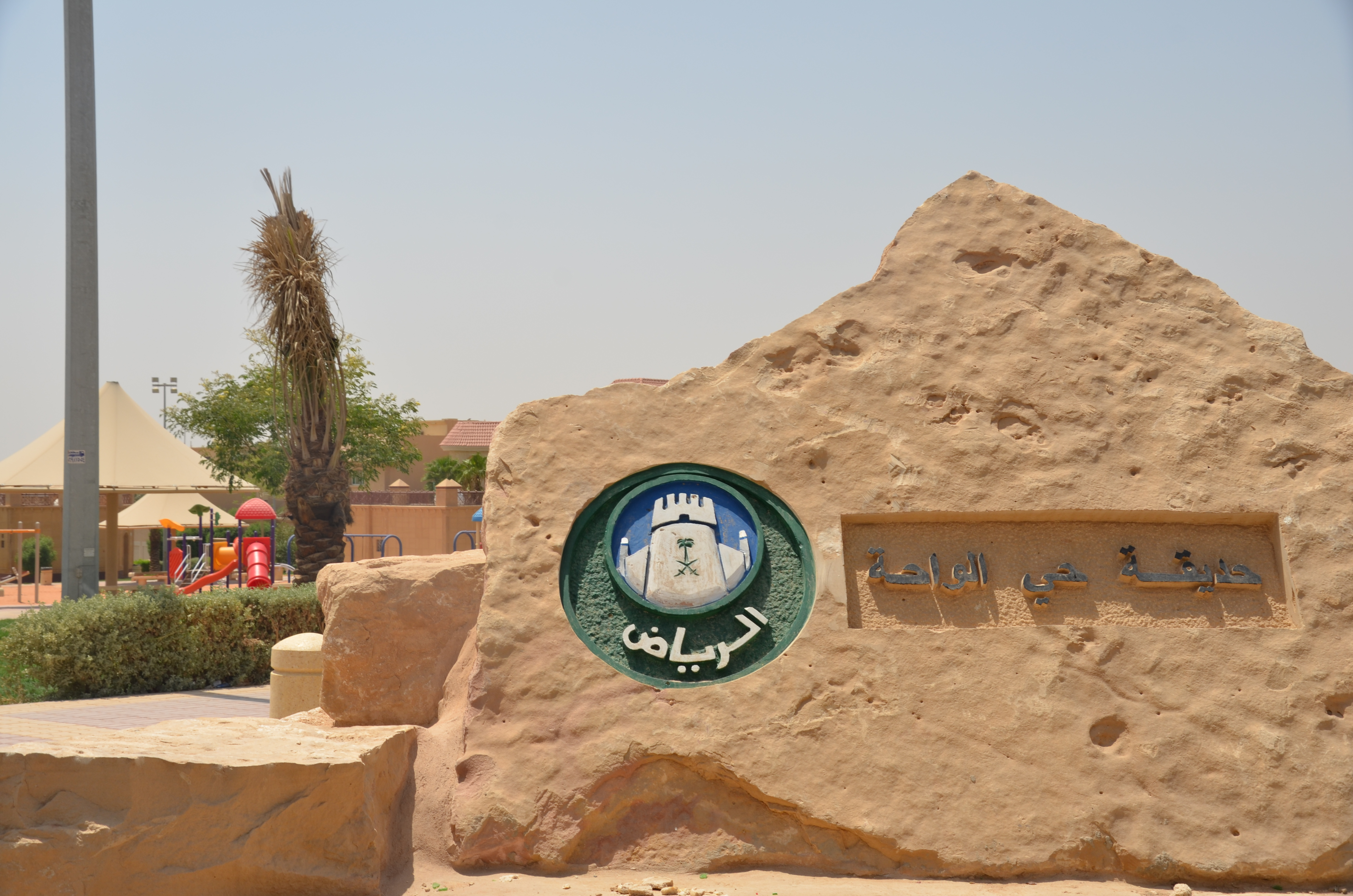
Al-Wahah Park, 2012

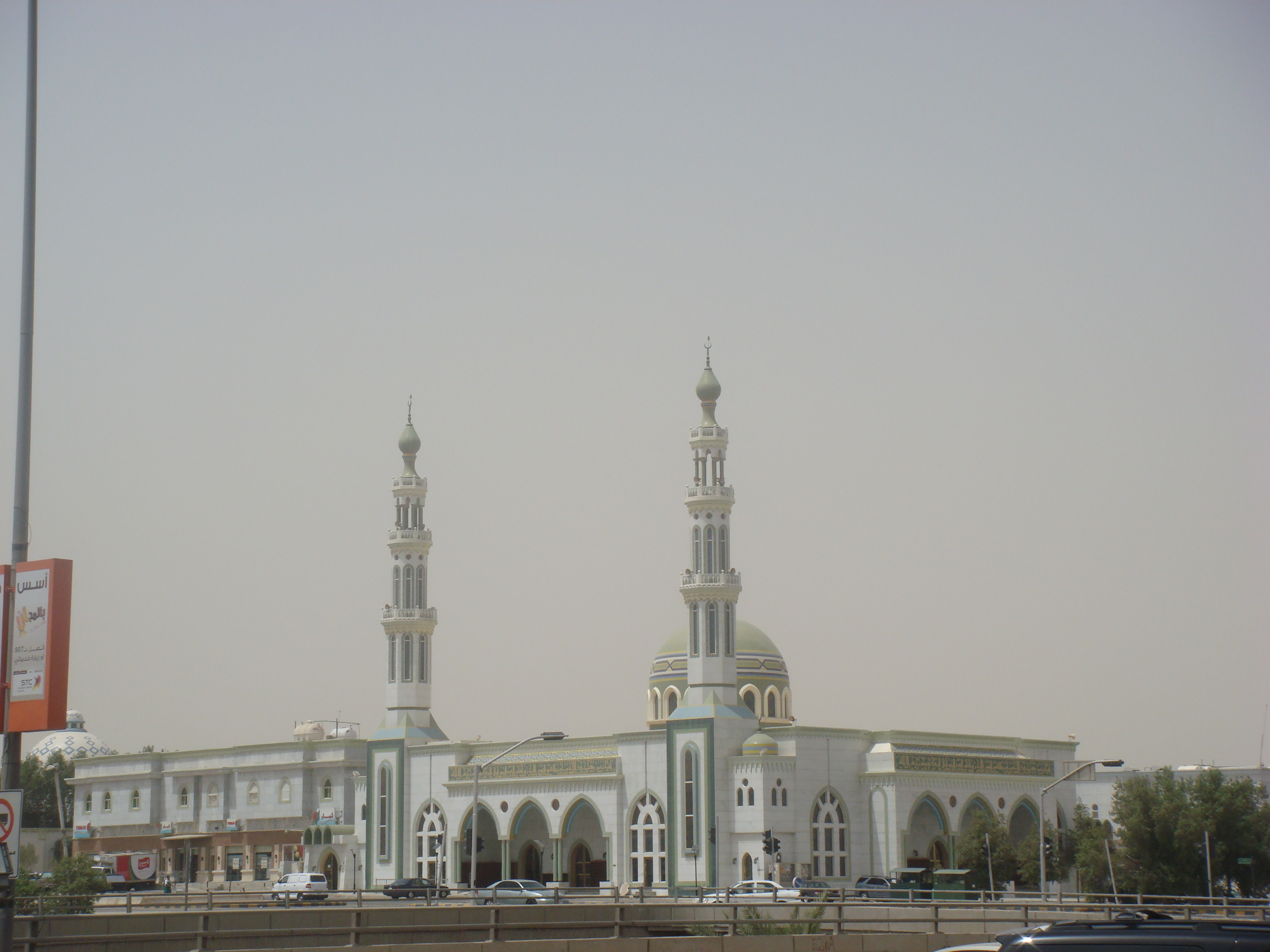
Fahd al-Owaidah Mosque, 2009

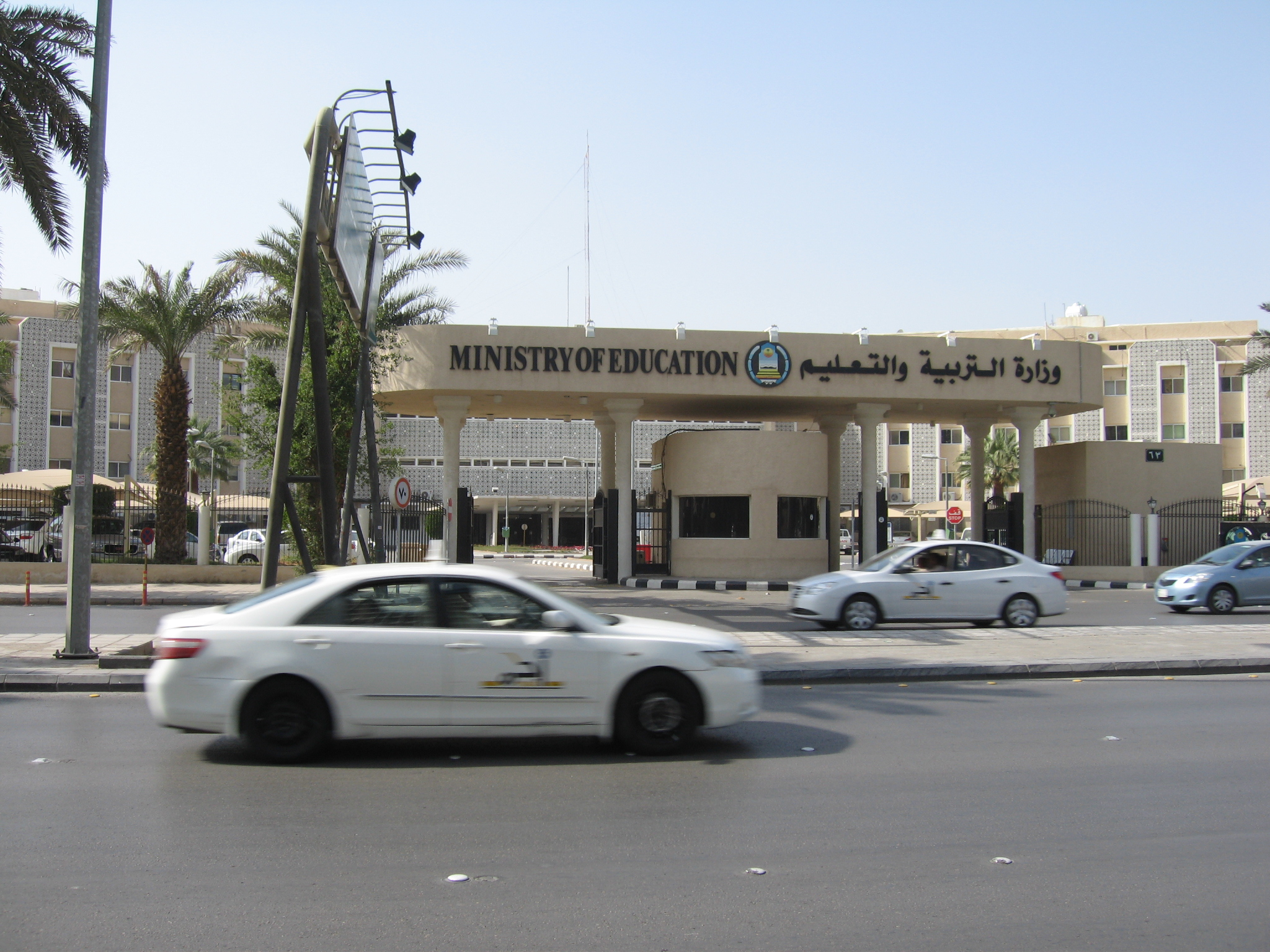
Ministry of Education headquarters, 2011
