= Al Wahah (Riyadh) =

Al-Wahah الواحة
- Neighbourhood
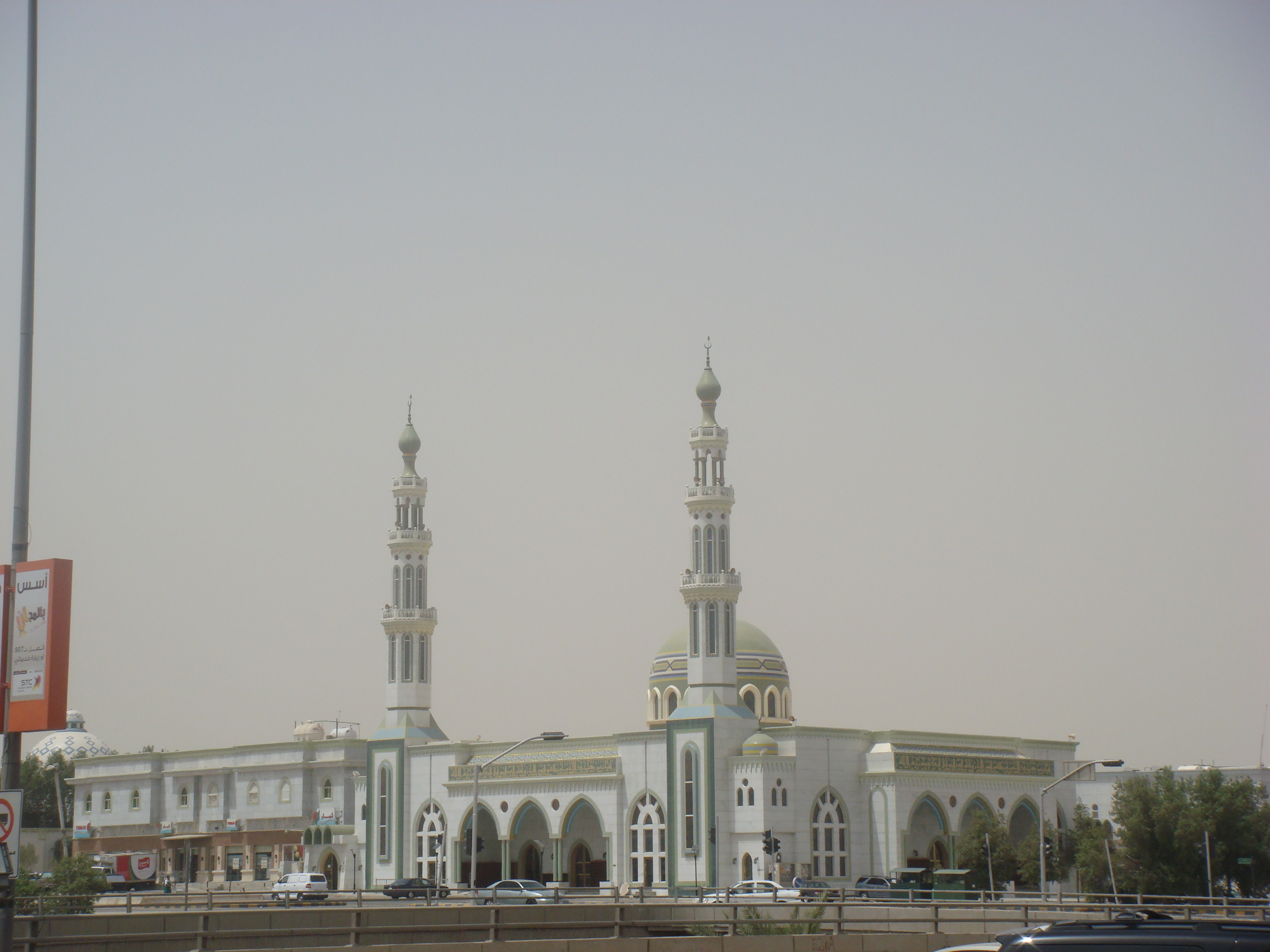
- Fahd al-Owaidah Mosque, 2009

- Location within Saudi Arabia
- Coordinates: 24°44′25″N 46°42′52″E
- Country: Saudi Arabia
- City: Riyadh
- Established: 1980
- Merged into King Salman Neighborhood: 2023
- Founder: Khalid bin Sultan

Government
  - Body: Baladiyah al-Ulaya

Language
  - Official: Arabic

Al-Wahah (Arabic: الواحة, lit. 'the oasis') was a neighborhood in northern Riyadh, Saudi Arabia, located west of King Abdullah District and east of Salah al-Din neighborhood in the sub-municipality of al-Ulaya. Covering an area of almost 798 acres, the district emerged in the 1980s and was initially owned by Prince Khalid bin Sultan. Along with the adjacent Salah al-Din neighborhood, the district ceased to exist in May 2023 when both of them where conjoined to form the King Salman Neighborhood.

It was located north of King Abdulaziz District, south of al-Nuzha, southwest of al-Mughzirat, southeast of al-Mursalat and east of erstwhile Salah ad-Din neighborhood.

Al-Wahah neighborhood was owned by Prince Khalid bin Sultan al-Saud, the former deputy defense minister of Saudi Arabia and son of Sultan bin Abdulaziz al-Saud, the Crown Prince of Saudi Arabia from 2005 until 2011. He later sold it to Saudi real-estate magnate Khaled al-Baltan.

It was renamed as King Salman Neighborhood by Saudi crown prince Mohammed bin Salman in May 2023 when it was conjoined with Salah al-Din neighborhood to honor the legacy of King Salman bin Abdulaziz, the ruler of Saudi Arabia since 2015 and his efforts to modernize Riyadh during his period in office as the governor of Riyadh Province between 1963 and 2011.

== Landmarks ==
=== Mosques ===
- Ibn al-Uthaymin Mosque
- Fahd al-Owaidah Mosque
- Princess Juhaier bint Bandar Mosque
- Al-Wahah Mosque

=== Parks ===
- Al-Wahah Park
