= 2002 Mecca girls' school fire =

Incident in Saudi Arabia

Coordinates: 21.416°N 39.816°E

- Location of Makkah Region in Saudi Arabia
- Location of Mecca Intermediate School No. 31
- Date: 11 March 2002
- Location: Mecca, Makkah Region, Saudi Arabia
- Deaths: 15
- Injuries: 50
- Property damage: School

A fire on 11 March 2002 at a girls' school in Mecca, Saudi Arabia, killed fifteen people, all young girls. Complaints were made that Saudi Arabia's "religious police", specifically the Committee for the Promotion of Virtue and the Prevention of Vice, had prevented schoolgirls from leaving the burning building and hindered emergency services personnel because the students were not wearing modest clothing. The actions of the religious police were condemned both inside the country and internationally. A Saudi government inquiry concluded that religious educational authorities were responsible for neglecting fire safety of the school, but rejected the accusation that the actions of religious police contributed to the deaths and that they stopped anyone from leaving because of immodest clothing. In the aftermath, the General Presidency for Girls' Education was dissolved and merged with the Ministry of Education.

== The Fire ==
According to Saudi press reports, the blaze at Mecca Intermediate School No. 31 started at about 8am. The blaze began in a room on the top floor, apparently caused by an unattended cigarette.

As a result of the fire and ensuing rush to escape, more than 50 young girls were injured, and 15 died. Nine of the dead girls were Saudis; the rest were from Chad, Egypt, Guinea, Niger, and Nigeria. The majority of the deaths occurred when a staircase collapsed as the girls fled the building. The residential property upon which the school was built was overcrowded with 800 pupils. In addition, the building may have lacked proper safety infrastructure and equipment, such as fire stairs and alarms.

According to at least two reports, members of the CPVPV, also known as Mutaween, would not allow the girls to escape or to be saved from the fire because they were "not properly covered", and the Mutaween did not want physical contact to take place between the girls and the Saudi Civil Defense force for fear of sexual enticement, and variously that the girls were locked in by the police, or forced back into the building.

Civil Defense stated that the fire had extinguished itself before they arrived on the scene. CPVPV officers did appear to object to Civil Defense workers going into the building; Human Rights Watch quoted a Civil Defense officer as saying,

"Whenever the girls got out through the main gate, these people forced them to return via another. Instead of extending a helping hand for the rescue work, they were using their hands to beat us."

The CPVPV denied the charges of beating or locking the gates but the incident and the accounts of witnesses were reported in Saudi newspapers such as the Saudi Gazette and Al-Iqtisaddiyya. The result was a very rare public criticism of the group.

Also criticized was the General Presidency for Girls' Education (GPGE), which administers girls' schools in Saudi Arabia.

== Reaction ==
The behavior of the religious police was widely criticized both inside the country and internationally. In a rare instance of public criticism of the organization, Saudi media accused them of hindering the attempts to save the girls. Hanny Megally, Executive Director of the Middle East division of Human Rights Watch, stated, "women and girls may have died unnecessarily because of extreme interpretations of the Islamic dress code. State authorities with direct and indirect responsibility for this tragedy must be held accountable."

== Inquiry ==
An inquiry was launched by the Saudi government in wake of the deaths. The investigation was led by Abdul Majeed, the governor of Mecca. The interior minister, Prince Nayef, promised that those responsible for the deaths would be held accountable. Nayef, at the time, stated that the deaths did not happen as a result of the fire, but rather the stampede caused by the panic. He acknowledged the presence of two mutaween and that they went there to prevent "mistreatment" of the girls. He said that they did not interfere with the rescue efforts and only arrived after everyone had left the building.

On 25 March, the inquiry concluded that while the fire had been caused by a stray cigarette, the religious educational authorities responsible for the school had neglected the safety of the pupils. The inquiry found that the clerics had ignored warnings that overcrowding of the school could cause a fatal stampede. It also found that there was a lack of fire extinguishers and alarms in the building. Accordingly, the cleric in charge of the school was fired, and his office was merged with the Ministry of Education. The report dismissed allegations that the mutaween (of CPVPV) had prevented the girls from fleeing or made the death toll worse.

Many newspapers welcomed the merger of the agency responsible for girls' education with the Ministry of Education. Previously, the agencies had been separate and girls' education had been in the hands of the religious establishment. The newspapers saw the merger as a step towards "reform".

== Aftermath ==
In the outrage over the deaths that followed, Crown Prince Abdullah removed girls' schools from the administration of the "General Presidency for Girls' Education"—an "autonomous government agency long controlled by conservative clerics"—and put it under the Ministry of Education, which already controlled boys' schools. In 1960, when girls' schools were first created in Saudi Arabia, they were put under the control of a separate administration dominated by conservatives as "a compromise to calm public opposition to allowing (not requiring) girls to attend western style school".

== Similar Incident ==
There was another similar incident in 2014; according to a report, a female student at a Saudi university died of a heart attack after being denied access to advanced medical assistance because the paramedics were male. Senior members of the faculty reportedly prevented the paramedics from entering primarily because the student was not fully covered and they did not want to get into trouble for having men in close proximity to her. This caused many Saudis to vent their anger and question the University's policies. However, the rector of the university denied this and said that they did all they could. An anonymous staff member said that the paramedics were not called immediately and there was a delay in letting them in. The staff member also said that it appeared that two of the female college deans at the university panicked after hearing about the heart attack.

== In popular culture ==
- From the Ashes is a 2024 Saudi Arabian drama film released on Netflix and directed by Khaled Fahed.
- The West Wing episode "Enemies Foreign and Domestic" features a similar event in Medina which was based on the fire.

== See also ==
- 2022 Ürümqi fire – High-rise fire in Xinjiang, China
- Cavan Orphanage fire – 1943 deadly fire at St. Joseph's Orphanage in Cavan, Ireland
- Islam in Saudi Arabia
- Wahhabism – Fundamentalist movement within Sunni Islam
