= Ahmed Alsuwaiyan =

Saudi Arabian politician

- أحمد بن محمد الصويان
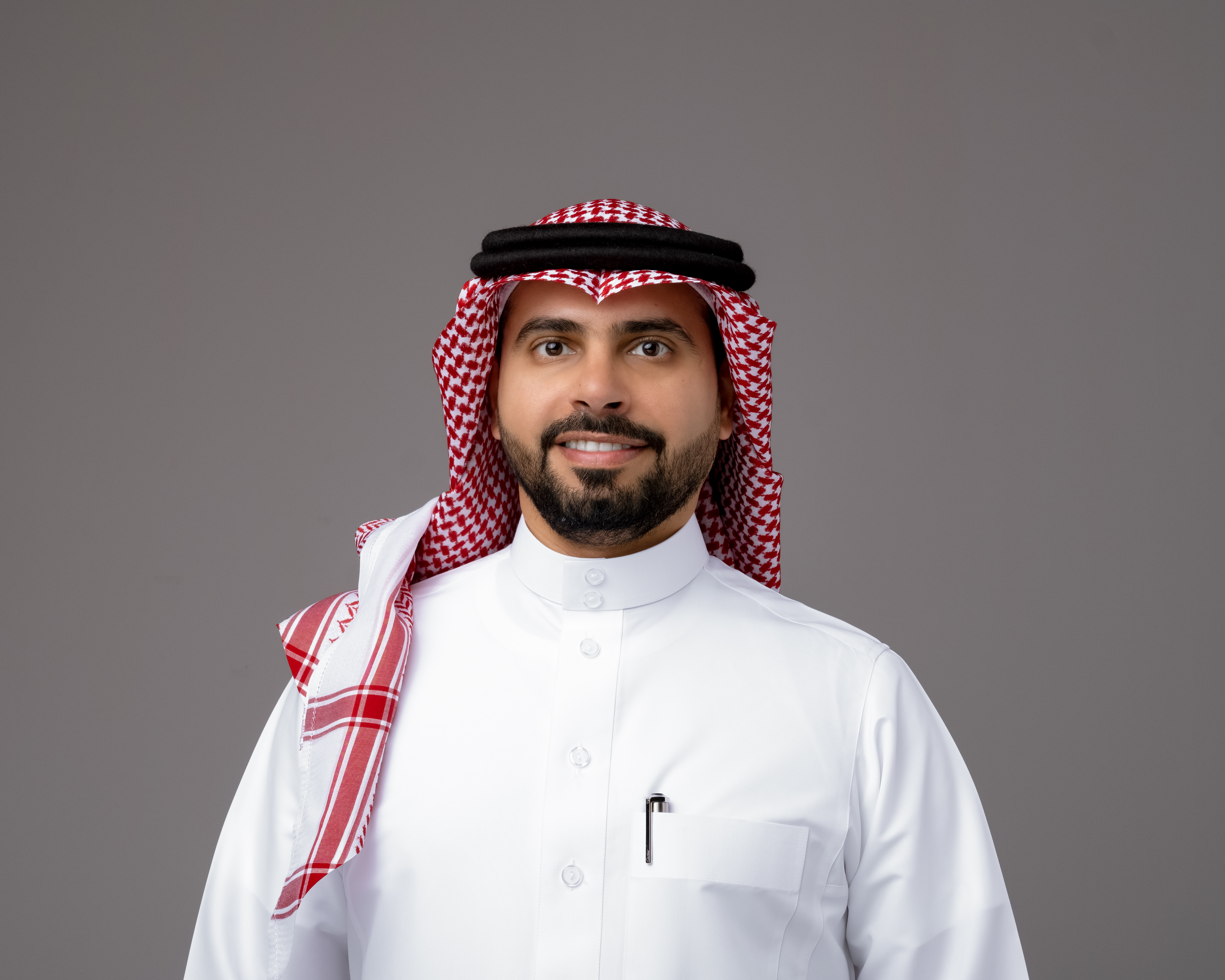
- Ahmed Alsuwaiyan 2023

Governor of the Digital Government Authority in KSA
- In office May 3, 2021 – now

Personal details
- Education: MBA, Prince Sultan University.; BCS, King Fahd University of Petroleum and Minerals,
- Profession: Politician
- Website: twitter.com/ahmedalsuwaiyan

Ahmed Mohammed Alsuwaiyan (Arabic: أحمد بن محمد الصويان) was appointed governor and board member of the Digital Government Authority (DGA) in May 2021. He is also a board member of the National Center for Government Resources Systems (NCGR), & Saudi Business Center (SBC). He is an active member of many other boards and committees.

Before his current role as the governor of the Digital Government Authority (DGA), he was the CEO at the National Center for Government Resources (NCGR) from March to May 2021. He was the deputy minister of finance for technology and development at the Ministry of Finance (MOF) from March 2017 to February 2021. In addition, he was vice president of Strategic Planning and Information Technology at the Saudi Industrial Development Fund (SIDF) from September 2015 to February 2017. He worked at Etihad Etisalat Company (Mobily) and held several positions in the company between March 2005 and August 2015, with his last position being Vice President of Applications Planning and Development. In 2025, a royal decree was issued extending the service of His Excellency Eng. Ahmed bin Mohammed Al-Suwaian (Governor of the Digital Government Authority) at the excellent rank for a period of four years.

== Education & academic qualifications ==
Alsuwaiyan holds a Master's degree in Business Administration (MBA) from Prince Sultan University (PSU) in Riyadh, Saudi Arabia, 2008, and a Bachelor's degree in Computer Science from King Fahd University of Petroleum and Minerals (KFUPM) in Dhahran, Saudi Arabia, 2004.

In 2021, he attained an executive certification for the Senior Executives Program (SEP) from London Business School (LBS) in London, United Kingdom. Additionally, in 2016, he got a certificate in Change Management from the Massachusetts Institute of Technology (MIT). Moreover, in 2014, he attained a certificate in Management Excellence from Harvard Business School (HBS) in Boston, United States. Furthermore, he earned many professional certifications in leadership, management, business development and technology.

== Experiences ==
Alsuwaiyan contributed to the establishment of Etihad Etisalat Company "Mobily" as well as the launch of its commercial operations in May 2005. Mobily was classified as the fastest-growing Telecoms brand in 2008 by the Global System for Mobile Communications (GSMA). His role has emerged in the Information Technology Department through developing and operating many-core systems and applications in customer relationship management, networking, and integration. He also participated in setting up a subsidiary of the company in Bangalore, India "Mobily InfoTech", as a company specializing in information technology services. He held various positions until he was appointed vice president for Applications Planning and Development in March 2015.

Afterwards, he moved to the government sector by joining the Saudi Industrial Development Fund (SIDF) as vice president for Strategic Planning and Information Technology in September 2015. He worked on developing the fund's strategy by expanding the provision of financial products and services. He enhanced credit policies and re-engineered and designed financing procedures. Also, he led the Information Technology Transformation Program by improving infrastructure services, developing Enterprise Resource Management Systems, lending management, automating business services, and other internal systems.

With the launch of a comprehensive digital transformation in the ministry in various business sectors, he had an impact by launching an integrated digital strategy that resulted in many achievements, most notably the launch of (Etimad) platform in January 2018, which automated the entire procure-to-pay (P2P) process within the government sector, It organized the relationship between government agencies and the MoF on the one hand, and the private sector and commercial banks on the other. The system of disbursing financial wages for government employees (SARF) was also launched, a central payroll system for about three million employees. In addition, the Revenue Collection System (Tahseel), which represents the main government payment gateway and revenue collection system, exceeding 300 billion riyals annually, was launched in 2019.

He worked on expanding infrastructure, developing financial systems & treasury management, archiving & administrative correspondence, and other internal systems supporting MoF. All of which led to significant growth in operations and an exponential increase in the volume of business and services provided to government agencies and the private sector. Accordingly, A Cabinet Decision No. (373) was issued on February 16, 2021, to transform the Deputyship of Technology and Development into a financially and administratively independent center under the National Center for Government Resource Systems (NCGR). To further uplift the Kingdom's economy, Alsuwaiyan was appointed as the CEO in March 2021.

On Monday, May 3, 2021, Royal Decree No. (A/516) was issued to appoint Alsuwaiyan as the Governor of the Digital Government Authority in excellent rank, shortly after the establishment of the DGA.

== Board memberships ==
- Digital Government Authority (June 2021 – present).
- National Center for Government Resource Systems (NCGR) (March 2021 – present).
- Saudi Business Center (June 2021 – present).
- National Center for E-Learning (January 2022–present).
- King Abdulaziz City for Science and Technology (March 2017 – December 2019).
- Communications and Information Technology Commission (March 2017 – May 2021).
- Technical and Vocational Training Corporation (May 2017 – July 2019).
- Saudi Information Exchange Company (Tabadul) (October 2017 – September 2019).

And he member of several other councils and committees.
