= Adnan Mohammed Al-Wazzan =

- Born: 1951; Mecca, Saudi Arabia
- Died: December 6, 2024

Adnan Mohammed Al-Wazzan (1951 – December 6, 2024) was a Saudi professor of Comparative English Literature.

== Life ==
Al-Wazzan was born in Mecca in 1951. He earned a BA in English Language and Literature from King Abdulaziz University in 1974, and a PhD in Comparative Literature from the University of Edinburgh in 1981. He also received a postdoctoral fellowship from the same university in 1991.

Al-Wazzan worked in Saudi Arabian academia for nearly 30 years, spending most of that time in the Department of English at Umm Al-Qura University in Mecca, where he became a professor of Comparative English Literature. He also served as the university's Dean of University Studies for Women, and as Director of the Research Center for Social Studies at the Research Institute of Umm Al-Qura University. He was a rector of the university from 2007 to 2009.

Outside of academics, he was an Under-Secretary of the Ministry of Religious Affairs, Endowments, Guidance and Da’wa and Advisor to the Minister, a member of the Council of Saudi Arabian General Commission for Tourism and Monuments, a member of the Saudi Arabian Consultative Council (2006-2008), and a part-time council member of Saudi Arabia’s Human Rights Commission.

He was awarded the King Faisal International Prize for Islamic Studies in 2012 "for his highly authoritative, Arabic encyclopedia of human rights in Islam and its attributes in Saudi Arabia," a work spanning eight volumes.

He died on Friday, December 6, 2024.
