= Mohammed bin Abdullah Al-Salloumi =

Saudi author

- Education: Imam Mohammad bin Saud Islamic University
- Occupation: Writers
- Notable work: The Charitable sector and terrorist propaganda Innocent Victims of the Global War on Terror The third sector and opportunities: a future vision

Mohammed bin Abdullah Al-Salloumi (Arabic:محمد بن عبدالله السلومي) is a Saudi writer.

== Early life and education ==
Mohammed bin Abdullah Al-Salloumi has a bachelor's degree from the School Sciences of Imam Mohammad bin Saud Islamic University, in Riyadh. Then he got a master's and PHD degrees from the University of Wales in Britain, specialized in history. He was a former professor at Imam Mohammad bin Saud Islamic University and he held the same position at Umm Al Qura University in Mecca. He is a member in many local, regional and international associations and organizations including: a member of the association of Arab historians, a member of the Society for History and Antiquities of the Gulf Cooperation Council, a member of the society for Saudi History and Archaeology, a member of the board of trustees in the Islamic WAQF foundation.

== Career ==
Throughout his career Al-Salloumi published a number of books, including “Development and the voluntary sector – the cultural dimensions of the non-governmental sector”, which is about the link between development and the voluntary sector of its foundations and charities, as well as its scientific knowledge term, challenges, obstacles and remarkable successes of this sector and its effective contribution to a sustainable development partnership for societies and their renaissance. The author tries to explain and detail this term in what he describes as the rise of dominant cultures, and developments in the means of knowledge, and revolutions of technology, and problems of the youth, women and the family and the challenges of “the phase” to the Arab world and its globalization of market capitalism and its consumption patterns and effects on the social economy and its financing. In his book, Al-Salloumi calls for an association between the public and private sectors, on the one hand, and the charitable and non-profit sectors, on the other, to address and overcome these obstacles and challenges. He believes that this is what requires giving this sector empowerment in its moral and material right; to perform its great duties assigned to it, and to be a third and a non-profit sector contributing to most development processes and achieving the desired charity.

Mohammed bin Abdullah Al-Salloumi also published another book “Early volunteer experiences” (Arabic title: Tagarib Tataw’eyah mobkirah) in which he wrote on social and voluntary history in the old and recent homeland of volunteering, he also revealed through the book early volunteer experiences of what he described as a “modest volunteer figure “which could open up prospects in the means and fields of volunteering.This book has been considered by some critics to be a brief biography in which the writer tells of himself and how he did not seek any personal claim, material gain or party bloc, as well as some important periods of his life.

Al-Salloumi has published books in a variety of fields, including in the field of historical geography, in the book “Al-Rass and Historical Roles in Unity” which deals with the theme of community partnership, reflecting on the historical realities of most families and tribe present and visible in the Arabian island. In this book, Al-Salloumi refers to this theme is his book as the main reason for building a political unit as old as community partnership. He takes examples of how unity and cohesion have been created like in other towns and inhabitants of Saudi Arabia. He said that the main reason why he wrote and published this book was in his vision of how the national unity of many of our countries has become one of conflict, disintegration and division, while stressing that Saudi Arabia is not isolated from global conflicts.

== Works ==
- Witness from the Awakening (Arabic title: Shahid min Al-Sahwah).
- My Mother, My teacher (Arabic title: Omi Madrasaty).
- The Charitable sector and terrorist propaganda (Arabic title: Al-qita’ Al-Kayri wa D’awi Al-irhab).
- Innocent Victims of the Global War on Terror (Arabic title: tha’haya bare’ah lil-Harb Al-almiyah Ala Al-irhab).
- The third sector and opportunities: a future vision (Arabic title: Alqita’ Al-thalith wa Al-foras Al-Sahinah: Ro’yah mostaqbaliyah).
