= Ahmed bin Mohammad Al-Issa =

Saudi Arabian politician

Dr. Ahmed bin Mohammad Al-Issa
- احمد بن محمد العيسى

Minister for Education
- In office 15 December 2015 – 27 December 2018
- Preceded by: Dr. Azzam Mohammed Al-Dakhil
- Succeeded by: Hamad bin Mohammed Al Al-Sheikh

Dean of Riyadh College of Technology
- In office 19 February 1998 – 31 October 2001

Director of Al Yamamah University
- In office 08 February 2008 – 31 December 2009

Director General of Strategic Studies at the Royal Court
- In office 21 October 2011 – 4 June 2012

Deputy Chairman of the Riyadh Schools
- Incumbent
- Assumed office 20 July 2012

Advisor and Board Member at MiSK Foundation
- Incumbent
- Assumed office 21 June 2012

Chairman of the Scientific Committee of the First Saudi Technical Conference
- In office 18 November 2000 – 22 November 2000

Personal details
- Born: 20 December 1960 (age 65) Al-Ghat, Riyadh Province, Saudi Arabia
- Education: King Saud University Oxford University Pennsylvania State University

Ahmed bin Mohammad Al-Issa (born 20 December 1960) is a Saudi Arabian politician. He served as Minister of Education of Saudi Arabia from 15 December 2015 to 27 December 2018.

== Biography ==
=== Education ===
Ahmed bin Mohammad Al-Issa received a Bachelor of Art degree from the History department of the King Saud University in 1983. He earned a master's degree in Education in 1989, and a Ph.D. in Education in 1993, from Pennsylvania State University. In 2009, he completed an advanced program in management and leadership at Oxford University.

In 2002, Ahmed bin Mohammad Al-Issa became a full-time advisor for the Al Yamamah University project, Dean from 2003 to 2008, and Director the following year. In 2011, Ahmed bin Mohammad Al-Issa takes up the post of Director General of the Strategic Studies Department at the Royal Court.

=== Career ===
Al-Issa began his career in 1990 as associate Dean of Educational Affairs at the Riyadh College of Technology. From 1996 to 1997, he became the supervisor of the Curriculum Development Unit in the Technical Affairs Department of Universities. He then returned to Riyadh University of Technology as assistant Dean, then Dean from 1998 to 2001.

=== Minister of Education ===
Ahmed bin Mohammad Al-Issa was announced as the new Minister of Education of Saudi Arabia on 11 December 2015, succeeding to Azzam Al-Dakhil. As Minister of Education, he set a high priority on e-learning and more technology in the classroom, and initiated several programs around the kingdom to promote this issue.

In August 2016, Al-Issa and Irina Bokova signed two agreements to expand the number of UNESCO Chairs in Saudi universities, and the establishment of the UNESCO Junior Professional Officer Program.

In September 2017, during his official visit to Sweden, he signed a cooperation agreement with Swedish Minister of Higher Education and Research Helene Hellmark Knutsson to enhance education cooperation between Saudi Arabia and Sweden, and increase the number of Saudi scholarships to Swedish universities.

== Other mandates ==
- Since July 2012: Vice chairman of the Riyadh Schools
- Since June 2012: Advisor and board member at MiSK Foundation
- Since March 2008: Member of the International Commission for Quality Assurance in Higher Education in the free zones in Dubai.
- 2011-2012: Director general of strategic studies at the Royal Court
- 2008-2009: Director of Al Yamamah University
- 1997-2001: Dean of Riyadh College of Technology

== Publications ==
- Higher Education in Saudi Arabia: A Quest for Identity, Dar Al Saqi Publishing, Beirut, 2010
- Education Reform in KSA: Lack of Political Vision, Religious Cultural Obsession, and Educational Management Failure, Dar Al Saqi Publishing, Beirut, 2009
- Education in KSA: Policies, Systems and Future, Dar Ezzaytouna, Riyadh, 2005
