= Al Mursalat (Riyadh) =

Coordinates: 24°44′57″N 46°41′25″E

Al-Mursalat (Arabic: المرسلات, lit. 'radio installation') is a neighborhood in northern Riyadh, Saudi Arabia, located west of al-Nuzha and north of the King Salman Neighborhood in the sub-municipality of al-Ulaya. It was named after the telecommunication poles in the locality that were built in the 1960s and 1970s by the German multinational conglomerate Siemens AG. The neighborhood was officially established in 1974 when Saudi real estate magnate Ibrahim Saeedan purchased almost 25 acres of land in the area. The district hosts the head office of the Saudi Telecom Company.
