= General Presidency for Girls Education =

Government entity in Saudi Arabia, 1959–2002

- الرئاسة العامة لتعليم البنات
- The logo of GPGE outside its headquarters in Riyadh with a verse from Qur'an (20:114) calligraphed on the wall

Agency overview
- Formed: October 22, 1959; 66 years ago
- Dissolved: March 24, 2002; 23 years ago
- Superseding agency: Ministry of Education
- Jurisdiction: Government of Saudi Arabia
- Headquarters: Riyadh, Saudi Arabia
- Child agency: Presidency Agency for Girls Colleges

The General Presidency for Girls Education (GPGE) (Arabic: الرئاسة العامة لتعليم البنات), also known as the Directorate General for Girls Education (DGGE), was an autonomous government entity in Saudi Arabia that regulated nearly all forms of women's education in the country from 1959 to 2002, independent from supervision of the Ministry of Knowledge.

== History ==
Established in 1959 through a royal decree issued by King Saud, it supervised both state-run and private schools for girls, except foreign ones and exercised powers parallel to the Ministry of Knowledge, which then only had authority over schools with male students. It was dissolved and subsequently merged with the Ministry of Knowledge in the aftermath of the Mecca girls' school fire incident in 2002.
