= Ministry of Higher Education (Saudi Arabia) =

Defunct ministry that regulated Saudi Arabia's tertiary education

- وزارة التعليم العالي
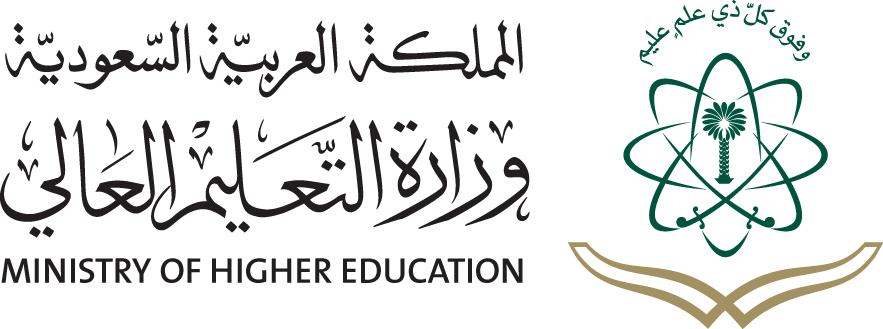

Agency overview
- Formed: May 19, 1975; 50 years ago
- Dissolved: January 29, 2015; 10 years ago
- Superseding agency: Ministry of Education
- Jurisdiction: Government of Saudi Arabia
- Headquarters: Takhassusi Road, Riyadh, Saudi Arabia
- Website: www.mohe.gov.sa

Ministry of Higher Education (MOHE) (Arabic: وزارة التعليم العالي) was a government ministry in Saudi Arabia that oversaw tertiary education in the country. Established in 1975, it was disbanded and subsequently merged into the Ministry of Education in 2015 following a royal decree issued by then newly crowned monarch, King Salman.

== History ==
The Ministry of Higher Education was established in accordance with the Royal Decree No. 1/236 dated 8/5/1395 Hijri (corresponding to 19/05/1975) issued by the newly ascended monarch, King Khalid. The ministry was responsible to look after the growing higher education sector in Saudi Arabia. By the late 2000s, calls were being made within the Saudi academic circles asking for the ministry to be merged with the Ministry of Education. On 29 January 2015, the newly crowned King Salman approved the long-awaited demand and issued a royal decree that instructed the ministry to be merged with Ministry of Education. Khalid bin Abdullah Al-Sabti was the last minister to hold the position.

== See also ==
- Khalid Al Angari
