= Hamad bin Mohammed Al Al-Sheikh =

- حمد بن محمد آل الشيخ

Minister of Education
- In office December 27, 2018 – September 27, 2022
- Monarch: Salman
- Prime Minister: Salman
- Preceded by: Ahmed bin Mohammad Al-Issa
- Succeeded by: Yousef bin Abdullah Al-Benyan

Personal details
- Education: King Saud University; Stanford University

Hamad bin Mohammed Al Al-Sheikh (Arabic: حمد بن محمد آل الشيخ) was the minister of education in Saudi Arabia appointed on December 27, 2018 until September 27, 2022.

He was born in Riyadh in 1959.

He is a member of the council of ministers and the council of economic and development affairs. In the United States, he attended Stanford University, earning his Ph.D. in economics, planning and development in 1995. He also has an M.A. from Stanford University in 1987 and an M.A. from the University of San Francisco in 1985, receiving both degrees in economics, planning and development. He graduated from King Saud University in 1981 with a B.S. in economics.

He served as an advisor to the royal court from (2017–2018), and he is currently a member of several ministerial committees, task forces and councils. He is the chairman of the board of directors at the general commission for the guardianship of trust funds for miners and their counterparts. He also a member of the boards of directors for the royal commission for Al-Ula, the National Development Fund and the General Authority for Statistics.

At the ministry, he was the deputy minister of education for boys’ educational affairs (2011–2015). Al-Sheikh has had an extensive career in academia: vice-rector for development and quality at King Saud University (2009–2011), dean of King Abdullah Institute for Research and Consulting Studies (2008–2009) and vice-dean for development and accreditation at the College of Business (2007–2008). At King Saud University’s College of Administrative Sciences, he was the chairman of the department of economics (2006–2007) and a professor until 2011. He was a visiting scholar at Stanford in 1997 and a teaching assistant in the department of economics at the University of San Francisco from (1983–1984).

Al-Sheikh is a published researcher with a record at international conferences and seminars. He specializes in analyzing public policies and evaluating economic policies. His research has included international economic clusters, economic stability and structural and organizational reform policies. He has built standard and quantitative economic models and analyzed energy economics and natural and environmental resources.

In addition to advising the public and private sector, Al-Sheikh is an active member of several professional associations such as the Saudi Economic Society, the American Economic Society, the Association of Environmental and Resource Economists and the American Agricultural Economics Association. The royal court recognized his achievements awarding him the honorary First-Class King Abdulaziz Medal, the Battle Insignia and the Medal for the Liberation of Kuwait from the Joint Forces Command in 1991.
