= King Abdullah District =

King Abdullah District حي الملك عبدالله
- Neighbourhood
- Sohaibani and Partners Law Firm Head Office, 2024, inspired from the architecture of the Taj Mahal.
- Interactive map of King Abdullah District
- Coordinates: 24°43′40″N 46°44′27″E
- Country: Saudi Arabia
- City: Riyadh
- Established: 1980s
- Named for: Abdullah bin Abdulaziz

Government
  - Body: Baladiyah al-Ulaya

Language
  - Official: Arabic

King Abdullah District (Arabic: حي الملك عبدالله), or King Abdullah Quarter, is a neighborhood in northern Riyadh, Saudi Arabia, located east of King Abdulaziz District and west of al-Rawdah in the sub-municipality of al-Ulaya.

== Description ==
It emerged around the 1980s and is named after King Abdullah bin Abdulaziz, the ruler of Saudi Arabia from 2005 until 2015. It contains the Royal Saudi Air Force Museum and the head office of Sohaibani and Partners Law Firm.

The district is bounded by al-Rawdah and al-Quds neighborhood from the east, King Abdulaziz District and King Salman Neighborhood from the east, al-Mughrizat neighborhood from the north and al-Rabwah neighborhood from the south.
