= Umm al-Qura University =

University in Mecca, Saudi Arabia

Umm Al-Qura University جامعة أم القرى Jāmiʿah ʾUmm Al-Qurā
- Motto: Honored Education, Honored Place
- Type: Public
- Established: 1949; 77 years ago as College, 1981; 45 years ago as University
- Budget: SR 3.5 billion (US$ ~900 million)
- Faculty: 5,000+
- Undergraduates: 100,000+
- Postgraduates: 10,000+
- Location: Mecca, Mecca Province, Saudi Arabia; 21.3254°N 39.9451°E
- Campus: Abidiyyah (Mecca), Aziziyah (Mecca), Al-Zahir (Mecca), Al-Lith, Al-Qundufah, Jamoom
- Website: uqu.edu.sa

Umm al-Qura University (UQU; Arabic: جامعة أم القرى, romanized: Jāmiʿah ʾUmm al-Qurā, lit. 'Mother of All Villages') is a public university in Mecca, Saudi Arabia. The university was established as the College of Sharia (Islamic law) in 1949 during the reign of King Abdulaziz ibn Saud before being joined by new colleges and renamed as Umm al-Qura through a royal decree in 1981.

UQU started primarily as an Islamic university offering degrees in Islamic Law, Theology and Arabic language studies. It now offers more courses in such diverse subjects as Technology Management, Business Management, Islamic Economics, Marketing, Engineering, Technology, Medicine, Education, Architecture, as well various Applied, Social and Engineering Sciences. In 2015, the UQU annual budget hovered around SR 3 billion (US$801,399,900).

== Colleges ==
- College of Shari`ah (Law and Islamic Studies)

The College of Shari`ah (Law and Islamic Studies) was established in 1369 A.H. It was the first college and foundation of the university. Four additional colleges were later founded out of this college, namely:

1. College of Da'wah (Comparative Religion), established in 1401 A.H
2. College of Arabic Language, established in 1401 A.H
3. College of Regulations and Judicial Studies, established in 1432 A.H
4. College of Economics and Islamic Finance, established in 1432 A.H
- College of Da'wah and Fundamentals of Religion

The College of Da'wah 'Islamic Call' and Fundamentals of Religion was established on 21/12/1401 A.H (20 October 1981).

By the beginning of the academic year 1402/1403 A.H (1982-1983), this College started to offer courses and it included four departments for both male and female students, However, by the academic year 1404/1405 A.H (1984-1985), the Department of the Qur'an and Sunnah was inaugurated by virtue of resolution No. 30/4/16/6827/1, issued on 22/07/1404 A.H (23 April 1984), according to the resolution of university's high council during its second session dated 25/06/1404 A.H (28 March 1984), which required moving the Department of the Qur'an and Sunnah from the College of Shari`ah (Islamic Law) to the College of Da'wah and Usul-ud-Din (Call to Islam and Religion's Fundamentals).

The College has four departments:

1- Department of Da'wah and Usul-ud-Din;

2- Department of Kitab and Sunnah;

3- Department of Aqidah (Creed);

4- Department of Qira'at (various readings of the Qur'an).

The postgraduate studies in the specializations of the college started since it was supervised by the College of Shari`ah, before their separation took effect. In 1420 A.H (1999), the deputy deanship of the College of Da'wa and Usul-ud-Din for postgraduate studies was established as it started to supervise the postgraduate studies in the college.

- College of Arabic Language

The Department of Arabic was established in 1962 as an independent department at the College of Education before it was joined to the College of Shari`ah in 1965. Graduate Studies were introduced to the department in 1973 and the College of Arabic Language was created by a royal decree in 1981.

The College includes the following departments:

1. Department of Arabic Linguistics, Grammar and Morphology.

2. Department of Classical Arabic Rhetoric and Literary Criticism.

3. Department of Literature.

The College offers the Bachelors, Masters, and Ph.D. Degrees in all the above-mentioned disciplines, except for the Department of the Languages of Islamic Societies which offers the Bachelors degree only.

Faculty members at the CoB are involved in leading-edge research in such diverse areas as Strategic Management, Optimization, Supply Chain Management, Information Systems, Technology Management, Operations Research, Supply Chain Management, Sustainability, Decision Modeling, Accounting and Finance, Marketing Management, Economics, Mathematical Modeling, Pedagogy, etc. The research is disseminated through publications in international journals and presentations at world-renowned conferences, workshop, and symposiums. The CoB faculty members are working on various industry- and government-funded research projects (including, NSTIP, KACST, ICRS, etc.).

- College of Social Sciences

The College of Social Sciences was established in 1404 A.H (1984). It has four departments, listed as follows:

1- Department of Geography

2- Department of English Language

3- Department of Social service

4- Department of Media

- College of Education

As of Rajab 1390 (September 1970), the College of Education became a university college when it was merged into and became part of King Abdulaziz University, from Rajab 1390 (September 1970) until Rajab 1401 A.H (May 1981) when it finally joined Umm Al-Qura University. During this period, academic departments were established successively and the college eventually comprised the following departments:

1- Department of Islamic Education.

2- Department of Curriculum and Instruction.

3- Department of Psychology.

4- Department of Special Education.

5- Department of Physical Education (Sports).

6- Department of Kindergarten.

7- Department of Family Education.

8- Department of Educational Administration.

- College of Applied Sciences

The College of Applied Sciences, the first scientific college at Umm Al-Qura University, was established in 1990 and includes four departments (Physics, Mathematics, Chemistry and Biology). The college departments award bachelor's and master's degrees and also the departments of chemistry and biology award the Ph.D. degree. It now has over 60 laboratories as well as an interactive training center.

- College of Engineering and Islamic Architecture

In 1402 A.H (1982), the College of Engineering and Islamic Architecture was established as part of the College of Applied and Engineering Sciences. It was the first Engineering department in the university and the kernel that later formed the present College of Engineering and Islamic Architecture.

The Academic Departments of the College of Engineering and Islamic Architecture are as follows:

1- Department of Islamic Architecture.

2- Department of Electrical Engineering.

3- Department of Mechanical Engineering.

4- Department of Civil Engineering.

Degrees offered: Bachelor's and Master's degrees are offered in all the aforementioned departments, all of which are ABET Accredited.

Bachelor's degree Requirements: The bachelor's degree normally takes five years of full-time study (ten semesters), and each department requires successful fulfilment of a certain number of credit hours as follows:

- Department of Mechanical Engineering: (165) credit hours.

- Department of Civil Engineering: (165) credit hours.

- Department of Electrical Engineering: (160) credit hours.

- Department of Islamic Architecture: (169) credit hours.

Master's degree Requirements: The master's degree normally takes two years of full-time study (four semesters), and each department requires successful fulfilment of a certain number of credit hours as follows:

- Department of Mechanical Engineering: (42) credit hours.

- Department of Civil Engineering: (42) credit hours.

- Department of Electrical Engineering: (42) credit hours.

- Department of Islamic Architecture: (43) credit hours.

- College of Computers and Information Systems

The College of Computers and Information Systems at Umm Al-Qura University was established in 1426H. It includes four academic Departments:

1- Department of Computer Engineering

2- Department of Computer Science

3- Department of Information Systems

4- Department of Information Sciences

all of which award the Bachelor's degree. The college also award the Master's degree in Computer Science. Years ago the college became internationally accredited by the Accreditation Board for Engineering and Technology (ABET). It includes 230 members of teaching staff, and 3500 students to achieve the college's vision and its noble mission.

- College of Dental Medicine

The College of Dental Medicine is one of the latest faculties in UQU. It was founded in 2007 by the decree no. 13/47/1428 dated 27/8/1428 hijri.

- College of Medicine

The College of Medicine at Umm Al-Qura University, established in 1995 as the first medical college in Mecca.

- College of Pharmacy

The College of Pharmacy was established in the year 2006.

- College of Public Health and Health Informatics

The College of Public Health and Health Informatics was established in 1432 A.H./2011 A.C..

- College of Nursing was created as a separate college in 1426H.

The college is made up of three departments:

- Department of community nursing and mass-gathering health care,

- Department of Nursing Science and Research,

- Department of Nursing Practices.

- College of Applied medical Science

In 1983 A.D., the Universities Supreme Council approved in its first session dated 20/05/1403 A.H (5 March 1983), the establishment of the Medical Sciences Department, to be affiliate to the College of Applied Sciences, Umm Al-Qura University, Makkah Al-Mukarramah. The first class was admitted in 1985, consisting of 20 students and the Department became the seed of the College of Medicine and Medical Sciences. In 1986, the late King Fahd Ibn Abdul Aziz, laid down the cornerstone of the new campus of Umm Al-Qura University in Abidiyyah and issued directives to adopt necessary preparations and steps for the establishment of a college for medicine and medical sciences as well as a university hospital for the college students' education and training. In 1995, the resolution of the Universities Higher Council on the conversion of "Medical Sciences Department" to the "College of Medicine and Medical Sciences." The first class of female students was admitted to the College of Medicine and Medical Sciences in 1998. In 2005, the separation between the Medical Sciences Department and the College of Medicine was approved that the Department became an independent college nominated, "College of Medical Applied Sciences" to encompass four academic specialities:

1- Laboratory Medicine Program.

2- Physiotherapy Program.

3- Clinical Nutrition program.

4- Clinical Technology which includes Emergency Medical Services program, Anesthesia Technology Program and Respiratory Care Program.

== Ranking ==
Over the last years, Umm Al-Qura university has secured its place among the top 500 universities in the world (QS)

The latest rankings are as follows:

- QS World University Rankings: 447 (2022)
- Times Higher Education World University Rankings: 601-800 (2022)

== Accreditation ==
All programs in all the engineering-related colleges were evaluated for "Substantial-Equivalency" recognition by the Accreditation Board for Engineering and Technology (ABET). They were found substantially equivalent to similar accredited programs in the US and elsewhere.

In May 2014, all Business and Management degree programs offered by the College of Business (CoB) are formally declared Eligible for Accreditation by the Association to Advance Collegiate Schools of Business (AACSB). The CoB is an academic member of AACSB International and EFMD Global. Nevertheless, with an unfortunate change of CoB leadership and departure of a key professor and leader of these accreditation efforts, these efforts were brought to a screeching stop by the then new-dean Sultan Albogami. With the appointment of a new dean, Ehsan Al-Mua'taz, these efforts towards development and improvement may start again.

As of Sept. 2015, all Medical, Dentistry, Nursing, and Pharmacy related academic programs are globally accredited by accrediting bodies in North America and/or European Union.

In addition to these global accreditations, the university is fully accredited by the National Commission for Academic Accreditation and Assessment (NCAAA) of Saudi Arabia.

== See also ==
- List of universities and colleges in Saudi Arabia
- Higher Education in Saudi Arabia
- Education in Saudi Arabia
