= Saudi Industrial Development Fund =

Financial wing of the Saudi Arabian government

The Saudi Industrial Development Fund (SIDF)
- Native name: صندوق التنمية الصناعية السعودي
- Founded: 1974
- Headquarters: Riyadh, Saudi Arabia
- Key people: Ibrahim Almoajil, (Director General)
- Website: www.sidf.gov.sa/en/

The Saudi Industrial Development Fund (SIDF) is a financial wing of the Saudi Arabian government established in 1974. The SIDF was established to provide mid-term and long-term loans to the private industrial sector. Its Chief Executive Officer is Dr. Ibrahim Almojel. In 2018, the fund had appropriations of more than US$2.4 billion, which has led to the establishment of 108 industrial projects. SIDF previously financed only local manufacturing businesses, but in 2019 SIDF started to finance energy, logistics and mining projects in Saudi Arabia.

== SIDF and Vision 2030 ==
SIDF exerts efforts to maintain its pioneering role in the development of the local industrial sector and keep abreast with the latest developments.Saudi Vision 2030, it attains this goal by pushing for integration with government entities, and expands to cover a number of sectors in the areas of industry, energy, mining, and logistics.
