= Prince Sultan University =

Private university in Riyadh, Saudi Arabia

- جامعة الأمير سلطان
- Former name: Prince Sultan College (1998–2003)
- Motto in English: Excellence in higher education
- Type: Private
- Established: 1998; 28 years ago
- Parent institution: Al-Riyadh Philanthropic Society
- Accreditation: NCAAA
- Academic affiliations: ACBSP
- Rector: Dr. Ahmed Al Yamani
- President of the Board of Trustees: Abdulaziz bin Mohammed bin Ayyaf
- Students: 3500+
- Location: Riyadh, Saudi Arabia
- Language: English
- Nickname: Falcons
- Website: www.psu.edu.sa

Prince Sultan University (PSU) (Arabic: جامعة الأمير سلطان), formerly Prince Sultan College, is a private university in Riyadh, Saudi Arabia, located in the King Salman Neighborhood. Established in 1998, it is the first private institute of Saudi Arabia and was named after the country's then-defense minister Prince Sultan bin Abdulaziz, who later served as the Crown Prince of Saudi Arabia from 2005 until his death in 2011.

Initially, it was founded as Prince Sultan Private College in 1998 by the Riyadh Philanthropic Society for Sciences and received university status in 2003. The university offers a number of bachelor's and master's degrees in various business, technical, and humanities fields.

== History ==
Prince Sultan University began as Prince Sultan College, which was established in 1998 and welcomed its first cohort of students the following year. In 2003, the Ministry of Higher Education granted the college university status. Prince Sultan University is described by the Saudi government’s Study in Saudi platform as the first non-profit private university in Saudi Arabia.

== Colleges and Departments ==
Prince Sultan University is organized into six colleges and offers undergraduate and postgraduate programs across fields including engineering, computer science, business administration, architecture, and law.

- College of Architecture and Design
  - B.S in Architecture
  - B.S in Interior Design
- College of Business Administration
  - B.S in Aviation Management
  - B.S in Accounting
  - B.S in Marketing
  - B.S in Finance
  - MBA, Master in Business Administration
    - MBA, Master of Business Administration for Military College Graduates
- College of Computer and Information Sciences
  - B.S in Computer Science
  - B.S in Information Systems
  - B.S in Software Engineering
  - M.S in Cybersecurity
  - M.S in Software Engineering
- College of Engineering
  - B.S in Civil and Environmental Engineering
  - B.S in Electrical Engineering
  - B.S in Production & Manufacturing Engineering Management
  - B.S in Communications & Networks Engineering
  - B.S in Construction Engineering
  - B.S in Mechanical Engineering
  - B.S in Industrial & Systems Engineering
  - MEM, M.S in Engineering Management
- College of Medicine
- College of Humanities and Sciences
  - B.A in Translation
  - B.A in Applied Linguistics College of Law
  - B.A in Law
  - MCL, Master of Commercial Law

== Notable alumni ==
- Ahmed Alsuwaiyan, was appointed Governor and board member of the Digital Government Authority (DGA) in May 2021.

== See also ==
- List of universities and colleges in Saudi Arabia
