= National Center for Assessment in Higher Education =

Saudi assessment center

Coordinates: 24°43′44″N 46°35′49″E

Kingdom of Saudi Arabia National Center for Assessment in Higher Education (Qiyas)
- المركز الوطني للقياس والتقويم في التعليم العالي

Agency overview
- Jurisdiction: Saudi Arabia
- Headquarters: Riyadh
- Agency executives: Khalid Al Angari, Chairman; Faisal Abdullah Al Meshari, Director
- Website: https://e-services.qiyas.sa/

On 19 August 2000, the Custodian of the Two Holy Mosques ordered the establishment of “The National Center for Assessment in higher Education” to perform standardized tests to measure student achievements applying for undergraduate study.

After the establishment, the center set the mission, vision and goals, to determine its plan and path, which based itself on preparing scientific and professional standards where equity and efficiency are present, and at the same time, to achieve global leadership in the formulation tests and standards in the educational and professional fields.

The center includes a number of functional, linguistic, and professional departments entrusted with the preparation of tests and assessments, as well as other supportive departments. The Centre has also developed an organizational structure that explains the process of decision making and how it moves from the top of the pyramid of management to the rest of the departments.

Since its establishment, the center has made outstanding accomplishments in the preparation and formulation of standardized testing in various educational and professional fields that has been published in annual reports, which is part of the center's strategy of clarity, transparency and communication with various segments of society.

== Establishment ==
On the 19th of Jumada al-awwal 1421 AH which corresponds to 19 August 2000, a royal decree numbered 471/8 affirming the Higher Education Council's along with the Council of Ministers Decision, which includes:

1. The requirements of college admission should include exams where its results are used as a standard along with the high school diploma results, those tests could be performed according to the following:

- Exams to test the student’s abilities and skills.
- Exams to test the student’s educational attainment, and those tests should be unified when it comes to majors which are the same.

1. The student is allowed to take the Exam more than one time in a year.
2. Establishing a managerially and financially independent center to be named “ The National Center for Assessment in Higher Education.”
3. To receive a fee, which is Commensurate with the costs of preparing these exams, to cover the costs of running the center and its development, and to organize the appropriate research in order to achieve this.

== Mission, vision, and goals ==
=== Mission ===
To provide educational and professional assessments that contributes in achieving equity and to elevate the efficiency of the institutions of our society, and to provide specialized studies and consultations in the field of educational assessment.

=== Vision ===
To achieve global leadership in the formulation of tests and standards in the educational and professional fields.

=== Goals ===
1. To develop means of educational assessment for all levels of education.
2. The preparation and the management of the standards of the professional licensing tests.
3. To assess educational achievements in order to elevate the efficiency of educational institutions.
4. To help in finding students with extraordinary abilities, skills, and creativity.
5. To attract and to sponsor experienced individuals in the area of assessment.
6. Provide professional and education consultation services in the area of assessment.
7. To perform specialized studies and research, and to spread the awareness on the importance of assessment in both the educational and the social fields.

== Tests and assessments ==
Educational tests presented by the center, are considered the most important test that are being developed, and it consists of two sections : The verbal and the quantitative. These test forces on student's analytical and deductive skills, in order to help them assess their learning capacity.

Linguistic tests, are the second type of tests provided by the center, it includes: English language efficiency test, and the Arabic language test for non-native speakers. The center also presents an assessment test for talented and creative students, as well as vocational tests, the most important of which: Vocational Standards Test for Teachers.

The test developing process goes through a number of steps, which includes theoretical and practical aspect. After the tests are formulated, they are subjected to examinations and testing through a specialized arbitrary committee, and prior to the final approval, the test are revised by a specialized committee, that consists of four experts.

== Stages of test and question construction ==
Test construction is based upon practical and scientific rules that are applied before, during and after each item until it finally becomes a part of the test. The following are the stages of constructing a test as followed by the Center.

=== Preparation ===
Each year the Center attracts a number of competent specialists in testing and educationalists to receive training in workshops that deal with the theoretical and applied aspects of the test. The theoretical aspects include:

1. the concepts on which a test is constructed
2. the goals and objectives of the test.
3. the general components, parts and sections of a test
4. the theoretical and technical foundations of test building.

Applied training includes:

1. discussing different types of test items. This aims at putting theoretical and technical concepts into practice.
2. collective training on writing items for various parts of the test
3. constructing items on individual basis (outside workshops) which is intended as peer teaching.

=== Test writing ===
- Each test writer is charged with making questions that are relevant to his/her specialty.
- Each test writer is given a code number that carries his/her personal data for confidentiality.
- Each item is given a code number that is kept intact. Each item is in the question bank even if it is not to be used in the test.

=== Arbitration ===
Various items of the test are arbitrated by a 3-member committee:

1. a specialist in the content area.
2. a specialist in measurement
3. an experienced educator.

Each item is either:

1. accepted as is, or
2. accepted after modifications, or
3. rejected as invalid.

Based on a set questionnaire the committee judge each item from various dimensions including the nature of the item, item difficulty, item conformity to the content controls, item bias, and item quality. Justifications have to be provided if an item is deemed invalid. All data is entered into the Center's computer.

=== Item entry ===
All items are entered into the computer marked with the relevant arbitration judgment except those deemed invalid or incorrigible.

=== Review ===
All the computerized items are reviewed by four testing experts to verify:

1. strict implementation of arbitration committee comments.
2. accuracy of numbers and graphs.
3. no grammatical, spelling errors or misprints.
4. full compliance of items to the test pre-set standards and regulations.
5. answer key is provided for all test items.
6. screening out the items that seem too complicated or might take too much time to answer.

=== Item trial (pilot testing) ===
Trial items are included in the actual test and they go through the same stages of test preparation above, but they do not calculate towards the final score.

=== Item analysis ===
Items are statistically analyzed so that the valid ones are selected for the test, while the invalid ones are rejected.

=== Test construction ===
Test is constructed in its final form. Items are randomly selected from those deposited in the question bank in a manner that adequately represents that various parts of test dimensions.

=== Test production ===
The test is finally produced. Trial questions are included and various versions of the test are prepared to avoid cheating. The test is printed in booklets that include test instructions and test items.

=== Equivalence of various test versions ===
The Center produces multiple versions of the same test. However, the Center has been cautious about discrepancies between various versions of the test in terms of difficulty, discrimination or content. An equivalence check is run during test construction based on scientific criteria to ensure test discrimination and differential capacity. Although it is more accurate to run equivalence test during construction stage, equivalence criterion is applied during and after the test.

== Giftedness and Creativity Assessment (Mawhiba) ==
Objectives:

The Objectives of this test is to detect the student's potential abilities and academic skills in the fields of Language, Mathematics, Science, and some creativity aspects, given to it by a series of dimensions, sections, styles, and images.

Sections:

1. Mental flexibility.
2. Scientific and mechanical reasoning.
3. Linguistic reasoning and reading comprehension.
4. Mathematical and spatial.

Eligible test takers: All levels of public education starting from 3rd grade all the way to the senior year of high school, in all the schools in the kingdom, note that the detection tools will be applied on the following educational levels:

1. 3rd grade.
2. 6th grade.
3. 9th grade.

== Educational tests ==
=== General Aptitude Test (GAT) ===
Objectives

This test measures a student's analytical and deductive skills. It focuses on testing the student's capacity for learning in general regardless of any specific skill in a certain subject or topic. The test measures abilities relevant to:

1. reading comprehension
2. recognizing logical relations
3. solving problems based on basic mathematical notions.
4. inference skills
5. measuring capacity

GAT Sections

The test is divided into two sections, the verbal and the quantitative. A. The verbal section. This section includes the following.

1. Reading comprehension. Testees are required to comprehend and analyze reading passages by answering the questions given.
2. Sentence completion. Testees are asked to fill in the missing parts in the text to make complete meaningful sentences.
3. Verbal analogy. Testees are required to match the relation between a pair of words given at the beginning of the question and a pair given in the choices.
4. Synonymy. Testees are asked to give a synonym that matches the meaning of the word give.

B. The quantitative Section

This section includes suitable mathematical problems that match General Secondary Schools Science and humanities majors. It focuses on measurements, inference and problem solving skills and requires only basic knowledge. The questions are divided as follows:

Arithmetic questions	40%
Geometry questions	24%
Algebra questions	23%
Statistices and analytical questions	13%

As for the humanities-major students, GAT includes 30 questions on arithmetic, geometry and mathematical analysis.

Test duration

The test normally takes two and half hours, divided on 25-minute intervals for each of the six test parts.

Results

Answer sheets are machine-graded and results are listed and printed and then announced. A student can receive GAT score via the Center's website or through an SMS for those registered for this service. Results are electronically sent to universities and colleges. For student who did the test more than once, only the highest score is sent. GAT is not a Pass-Fail test. The recorded score that the student receives represents the relevant position that the student occupies among the total number of students taking the test. Every higher education institution in Saudi Arabia has its own method of interpreting the relevant weight of GAT vs. General Secondary School final score. Competition in university admission is then based on the combined total scores of the GAT and General Secondary School in addition to the score obtained in any achievement test administered by the university (if required).

Is GAT a Pass/Fail test?

As noted above, GAT is no Pass/Fail test. This 100-point test carries a certain relative weight interpreted by the institution the student applies for. GAT score should not be compared to that of General Secondary School score. What really matters is the relevant position of the student compared to those of other students, according to the following table:

Score	Student's Position
81 and above	Top 5%
78 and above	Top 10%
73 and above	Top 20%
70 and above	Top 30%
61-65	The average
60 and below	Lowest 30%

=== General Aptitude Test (GAT) English Version ===
- This test is equivalent to the Arabic version of GAT but it is not a translation of the Arabic questions. This test is based on mathematical and verbal skills to measure:

- Reading comprehension
- Logical Relations
- Problem-solving skills
- Inductive skills
- Deductive skills

- Test Construction

- The test is made up of six sections.
- Items are of multiple-choice type.
- Some trial questions are used, not calculated towards the final score
- 120 items are included in the test: 68 verbal questions and 52 quantitative questions.

- Exam Duration:

The total duration of the exam (including the instruction part of the exam) is around three hours.

=== Achievement test for Science Colleges (Males) ===
- Questions and duration:

The test covers the general and key concepts in biology, chemistry, physics, mathematics and English covered in the courses of the three grades of General Secondary School. Questions vary in their focus on knowledge levels. Some questions measure comprehension, others measure application, inference and so on. Questions cover the subjects in even percentages as follows:

Biology	20%
Chemistry	20%
Physics	20%
Mathematics	20%
English	20%

The test is expected to last for three and half hours including instructions, paperwork and form filling. The actual test duration, 2.5 hours, is divided into five sections, 30 minutes each. The student has to strictly stick to the amount of time devoted to each section. All question s are of multiple-choice type. An HB2 pencil type has to be used for marking the right answer. Since questions do not require much complexity, no electronic calculator is allowed during the test session.

- Results

Once all exam sessions in all cities have ended, grading and analysis starts. Review process concerning students' personal data takes place in the main center headquarters in Riyadh. The grading process includes analyzing exam items and excluding the statistically inappropriate questions. Grading usually takes a whole week and the results come out soon after.
- Results are electronically sent to universities and you are not required to take any printed certificates to the universities.
- An SMS is usually sent to all students registered in the messaging service.
- You can also receive your results via phone number 920000696 or the results homepage

=== General Aptitude Test for University Graduates ===
Components and Duration

This test has a 2.5- hour duration and is presented in Arabic for university graduates. It has three parts: the verbal (linguistic), the quantitative (mathematical), and the logical (inductive-spatial). It mainly focuses on:

- Reading comprehension
- Discriminating the logical structure of linguistic expressions
- Inductive capacity
- Inference capacity
- Capacity to cognize logical relations, spatial and non-spatial
- Analytical capacity
- Deductive capacity
- Result interpretation capacity
- Problem-solving capacity based on basic mathematical concepts.

Sections of the test

The questions relevant to the three parts of the test are alternately presented in all six sections .Each section is devoted 25 minutes. All questions are multiple-choice type.

Objectives

This test aims at:
- Identifying students' research skills, which might predict success in post-graduate studies.
- Making students aware of their mental skills in preparation for post-graduate studies.
- Providing a fresh standard by which post-graduate students can be selected.

It is taken for granted that the well-renowned world universities use similar tests, e.g., GRE, to sort out the applicants for post-graduate studies

Eligible test-takers

Any student seeking post-graduate studies (humanities or science major) is eligible.

- Post-graduate students in the Saudi universities
- Post-graduate students in military programs
- Candidates for overseas scholarships.
- Candidates for higher diploma, locally and internationally.

Test Times

The test is presented 3 times a year, the times are listed in the following website.

=== Language Tests ===
Language tests are part of the assessment and measurement tests provided by the center through an unbiased objective approach, where the center provides the Standardized Test for English proficiency (STEP) as well as the Arabic Language test for non-native speakers, to serve academic institutions such as schools and colleges, that work on attracting qualified students.

==== Standardized Test for English Proficiency (STEP) ====
This test is designed to measure objectively the student's proficiency in English. The test is made up of 100 questions and some other trial questions that do not add up to the final total score. The following are the various parts of the test and their perspective percentages:

Reading Comprehension	40%
Sentence Structure	30%
Listening Comprehension	20%
Composition Analysis	10%

STEP serves as:
1. An admission test for students applying for English departments in the university
2. A verification tool for students' exemption from certain courses in English language programs (course waiver).
3. A placement test for English departments applicants.
4. A measuring instrument of English language proficiency for students seeking to apply for teaching positions, higher studies, business or any other professional field.

Students eligible to sit for STEP:

1. Students applying for English departments in the university.
2. Students applying for English departments and wishing to be placed according to their relevant proficiency level.
3. Students seeking an exemption from studying English courses in their respective programs.
4. Students applying for post-graduate studies.
5. English language teachers seeking to get a certificate in English.
6. Individuals seeking to obtain a job in the private sector.

Test Question items:

1. Test items are Multiple Choice type. Each question is followed by four possible answers (A, B, C, D). He/she is asked to choose the right answer.
2. Total time allowed for the test is three hours including instructions given before the actual test.

Tests times:

This test is presented three times every year, the test times are on the center's website.

==== Arabic Language Test for Non-Native Speakers ====
This test is designed to measure the non-native speaking student’s proficiency in the Arabic language.

- Reasons to develop this test:

Standardized tests are considered an evaluation and assessment tools, that reflects the development and advancement of societies; because it is usually created due to the need of attracting qualified individuals by the society’s sectors and institutions. These institutions often prove their efficiency through the means of having their employees pass certain curtain assessment tests, which are based on scientific and objective standards. It is curtain that teaching the Arabic language to non-native speakers has gone a long way in accumulating experience and success, and it well known that there is a need for an efficient and an objective way to assess the proficiency of a language for non-native speakers. When it came to choosing process amongst the non-native speakers in some programs, it is usually done through the criteria of competitiveness, the existence of a standardized test that facilitates the selection process proved to be essential. These test should also be developed by a specialized institution in the field of assessment. Thus, this specialized test has become the topping of the accumulated knowledge and long experience in teaching the Arabic language, it also adds a new dimension and an element of maturity and success to the process.

- Students eligible to sit for this test:

Perhaps the most beneficiary of this test are the academic establishments, whether it be schools, institutions, and universities, that seeks to attract non-native speaking students. For a long time, Arabic universities has been keen on attracting a large number of non-native speaking students. There are also other universities in the world that adopted similar approaches in accepting students seeking to study the Arabic language or to study other sciences using the Arabic language.
This test could be used in the following:
1. Joining a language program or academic tracks that require a certain level of proficiency in the language.
2. Exemption from certain academic requirements.
3. Joining jobs that require knowledge in Arabic language.
4. Document the student’s language level while studying and after.

- Targeted language proficiency level:

This test measures the student’s efficiency and skills in listening, reading, and writing using standard Arabic. In general, the test concentrates on the academic part of the language more than the other communication skills. Hence, it is more in sync with the programs that are available in Arabic countries, it also helps in connecting the student to the current culture of the Arab world.

The Test consists of the following skillset:

Reading comprehension	40%
Writing	35%
Listening comprehension	25%

The test is divided into 6 parts, every part is 25 minutes long.

- Test Consistency:

The consistency of the Arabic Language Test for Non-Native Speakers in its first draft 0.94; which means that this test has a high consistency rate.
