= Al Ulaya Sub-Municipality =

Al-Ulaya بلدية العليا
- Baladiyah
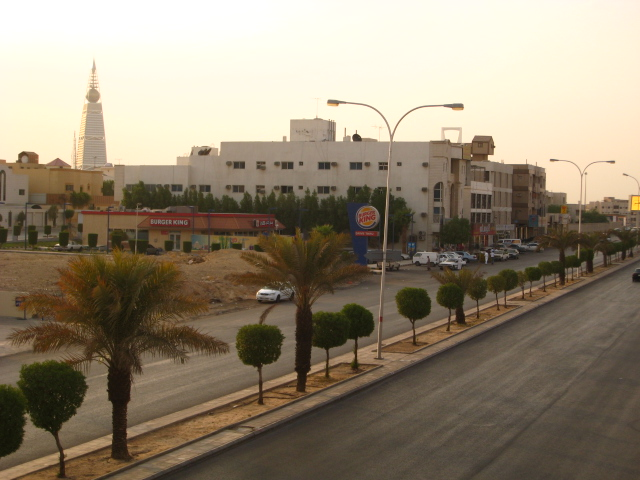

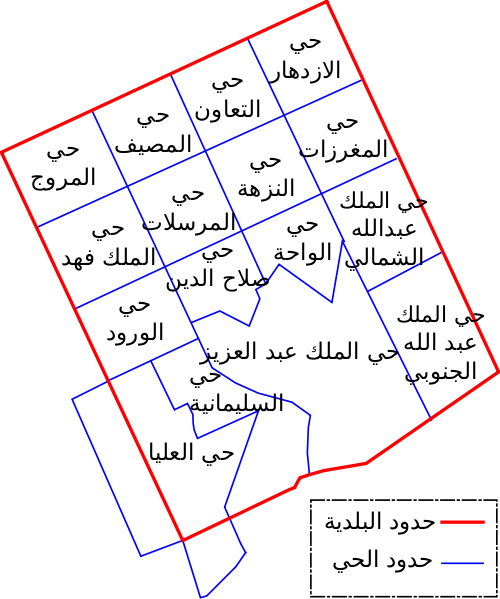
- Neighborhoods of Ulaya sub-municipality in Arabic
- Country: Saudi Arabia
- City: Riyadh
- Boroughs: List: al-Olaya as-Sulimaniyah King Abdulaziz District (North) King Abdullah District (South) King Fahd District al-Wahah Salahuddin al-Wurud al-Mursalat an-Nuzhah al-Mughrizat al Izdihar at-Taawun al-Masiaf

Government
  - Body: Riyadh Municipality
- Website: olaya.alriyadh.gov.sa

Al-Ulaya Sub-Municipality (Arabic: بلدية العليا) is one of the 16 baladiyahs of Riyadh, Saudi Arabia. Established in 1978 (1398 Hijri), it consists of 15 commercial and residential districts, including King Abdulaziz District, King Fahd District, King Abdullah District and most of al-Olaya and as-Sulimaniyah. It is responsible for their development, planning and maintenance.

== Neighborhoods and districts ==
- al-Olaya
- as-Sulimaniyah (partially)
- King Abdulaziz District (North)
- King Abdullah District
- King Salman Neighborhood
- al-Wurud
- al-Mursalat
- an-Nuzhah
- al-Mughrizat
- al-Izdihar
- at-Taawun
- as-Masiaf
