= Tamimi Group =

Saudi Arabian conglomerate

Tamimi Group of Companies
- Native name: مجموعة شركات التميمي
- Company type: Private
- Founded: 1942
- Founder: Ali Abdullah Al-Tamimi
- Headquarters: Dammam, Saudi Arabia
- Key people: Tariq Ali al-Tamimi, Chairman
- Number of employees: 21,000+
- Subsidiaries: 40+
- Website: tamimigroup.com.sa

The Tamimi Group of Companies, sometimes called the al-Tamimi Group, is a large Saudi Arabian conglomerate of companies involved in supermarket chains, hotels, catering, real estate, oilfield services & supplies, road construction, transportation and trucking, power generation and water filtration. The company is in partnership with Pakistani businessman and politician Sardar Tanveer Ilyas Khan.

== History ==
Founded in 1942 by the late Sheikh Ali bin Abdullah Al-Tamimi, the company is owned and managed by his heirs. The current chairman is Tariq Ali al-Tamimi.

== Activities ==
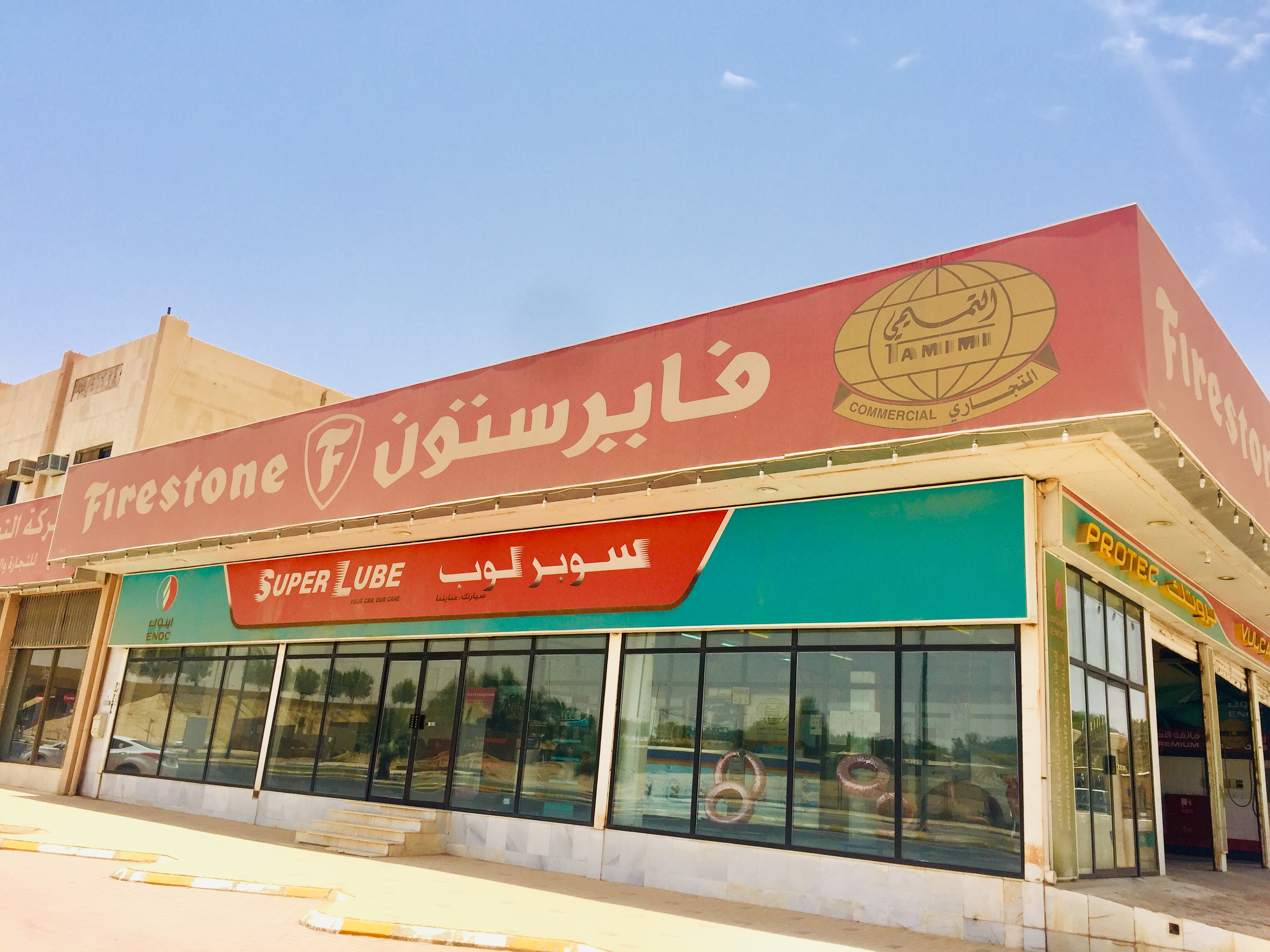
Al Tamimi Firestone in Unayzah

Beginning as a major parts supplier to oil giant Saudi Aramco, the Tamimi Group of Companies has several joint ventures, with companies as diverse as General Electric and Safeway.

In 2018, Tamimi Markets opened its headquarters and largest store in Dammam.

The Tamimi Group is active in the following sectors:

- Import and distribution: Tamimi Commercial Co. - TCCM (since 1949)
- Real estate development (since 1953)
- Power and industrial activities (since 1976)
- Food services and facility management (since 1977) and food industry (since 2009)
- Food retailing: Tamimi Markets (since 1979), with over 110 stores in Saudi Arabia
- Construction (since 1998)
