= Ministry of Education (Saudi Arabia) =

Government ministry of Saudi Arabia

- وزارة التعليم

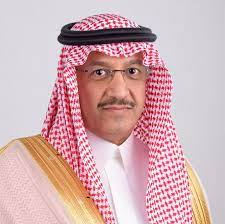
- Yousef Al-Benyan, Minister of Education since 2022

Government body overview
- Formed: 1926 (100 years ago) as Directorate of Knowledge
- Preceding agencies: Directorate of Knowledge (1926–1953); Ministry of Knowledge (1953–2003)
- Jurisdiction: Government of Saudi Arabia
- Headquarters: Airport Road, Riyadh 11148, Saudi Arabia; 24.7416058°N 46.7011849°E
- Government body executive: Yousef bin Abdullah Al-Benyan, Minister of Education
- Website: moe.gov.sa/en, official English website

The Ministry of Education (MoE) (Arabic: وزارة التعليم), known before 2003 as the Ministry of Knowledge and until 1953 as the Directorate of Knowledge, is a government ministry in Saudi Arabia that is responsible for regulating primary, secondary and higher education in the country. It was established in 1926 by King Abdulaziz ibn Saud in the Kingdom of Nejd and Hejaz. Since the amalgamations of the General Presidency for Girls' Education (GPGE) in 2002 and the Ministry of Higher Education (MOHE) in 2015, it became the sole body which supervises all schools, universities and colleges in the country.

== History ==
In 1926, Sultan of Nejd Abdulaziz Ibn Saud annexed Kingdom of Hejaz and dissolved the government of Hijaz as well as the Sultanate of Nejd and established the Kingdom of Nejd and Hejaz with running a dual monarchy. King Abdul established the Council for Knowledge which focused on education in Hejaz region. He appointed Salih ibn Bakri Shata to head the council. Then Kamil Al Qassab was made the head of the education directorate. The directorate was also headed by the following until 1953: Majid Kurdi, Hafiz Wahba, Muhammad Amin Fuda and Ibrahim Al Shura.

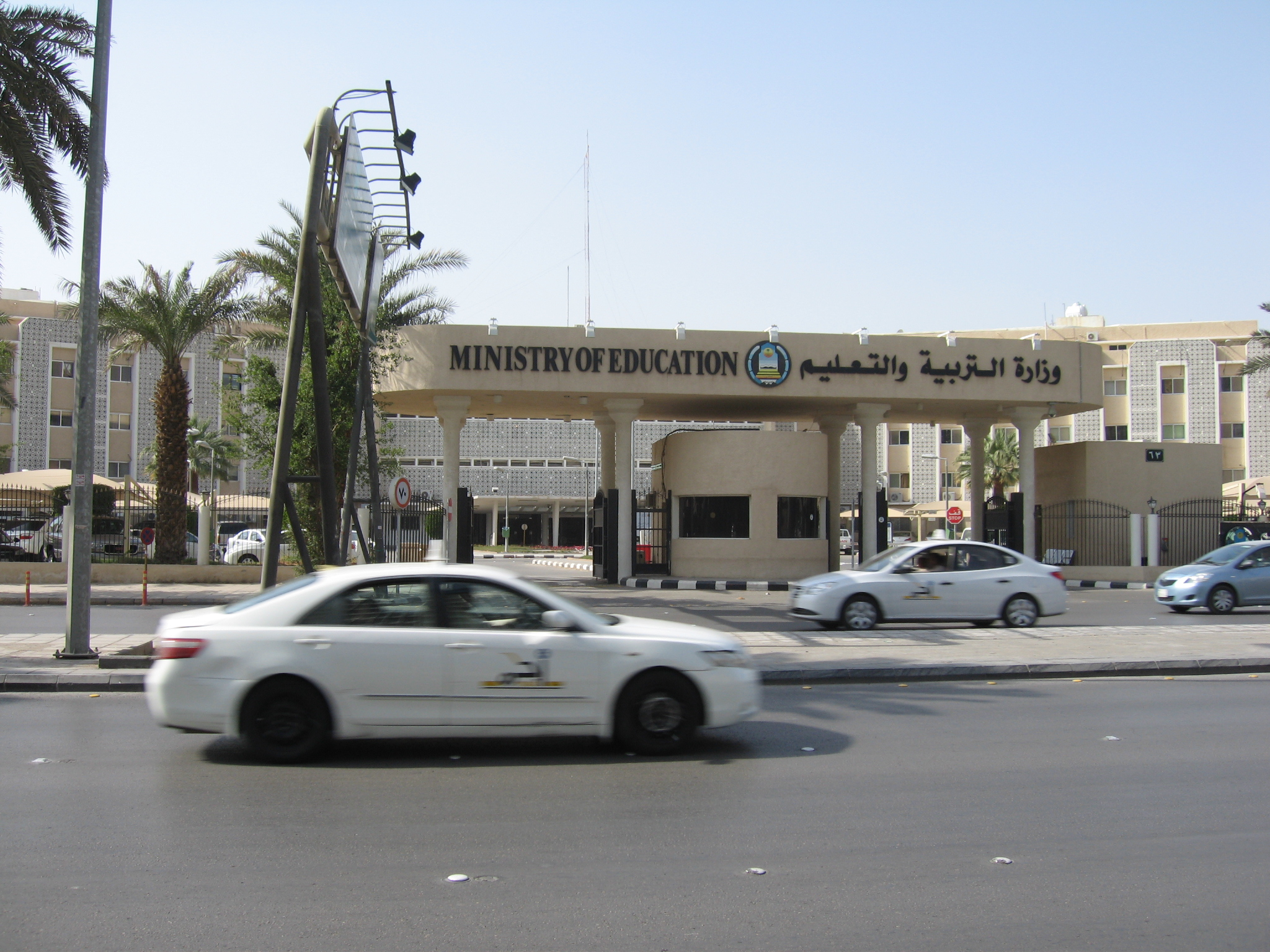
The Ministry of Education building in Riyadh

In 1953 King Saud bin Abdulaziz Al Saud established and merged the Directorate of Knowledge to Ministry of Knowledge and appointed Prince Fahd bin Abdulaziz Al Saud as the minister on 24 December 1953. In 1960, Crown Prince Faisal established General Presidency for Girls' Education. In 2002, King Fahd issued a royal decree which merged General Presidency for Girls' Education with the Ministry of Knowledge. It was renamed as Ministry of Education on May 1, 2003.

== Responsibilities ==
The Ministry of Education is responsible for formulating and implementing education policy in Saudi Arabia. It oversees public and private education at all levels, from kindergarten through higher education, and regulates educational institutions throughout the Kingdom. The ministry is responsible for curriculum development, teacher preparation, educational planning, quality assurance, scientific research, scholarship programmes, and digital transformation in education.

Its responsibilities include developing national education policies, supervising schools and universities, licensing private educational institutions, promoting scientific research, supporting innovation, and strengthening international cooperation in education.

== Organization ==
The Ministry of Education is headed by the Minister of Education and operates through deputy ministries and specialized agencies responsible for school education, university education, private education, curriculum development, planning and development, digital transformation, scholarships, and administrative affairs.

The ministry also supervises public universities, regional education directorates, research centres, and affiliated educational institutions across Saudi Arabia.

== Special education ==
The Ministry of Education provides educational services for students with disabilities through specialized institutes and inclusive education programmes. Formal special education began in 1960 with the establishment of the Al Noor Institute for the Blind in Riyadh, followed by similar institutes in Mecca and other regions of the Kingdom.

Students generally follow the national curriculum while receiving specialized instruction using Braille, sign language, assistive technologies, and individualized educational programmes according to their educational needs.

== Higher education ==
Since 2015, the Ministry of Education has supervised Saudi Arabia's public and private universities, university colleges, scholarship programmes, and research institutions. The ministry develops higher education policies, oversees institutional governance, supports research and innovation, and promotes international academic cooperation.

== Digital transformation ==
The ministry has implemented several digital education initiatives to improve access to learning and educational services. During the COVID-19 pandemic, it launched the Madrasati online learning platform, enabling remote education for millions of students across Saudi Arabia.

The ministry continues to expand the use of digital technologies, artificial intelligence, online assessment systems, and smart learning environments as part of the Kingdom's broader digital transformation strategy.

== International cooperation ==
The Ministry of Education maintains partnerships with international organizations, universities, and research institutions to promote academic exchange, scientific research, educational development, and capacity building. It has signed cooperation agreements with educational institutions worldwide in support of Saudi Arabia's higher education and research objectives.

== List of ministers ==
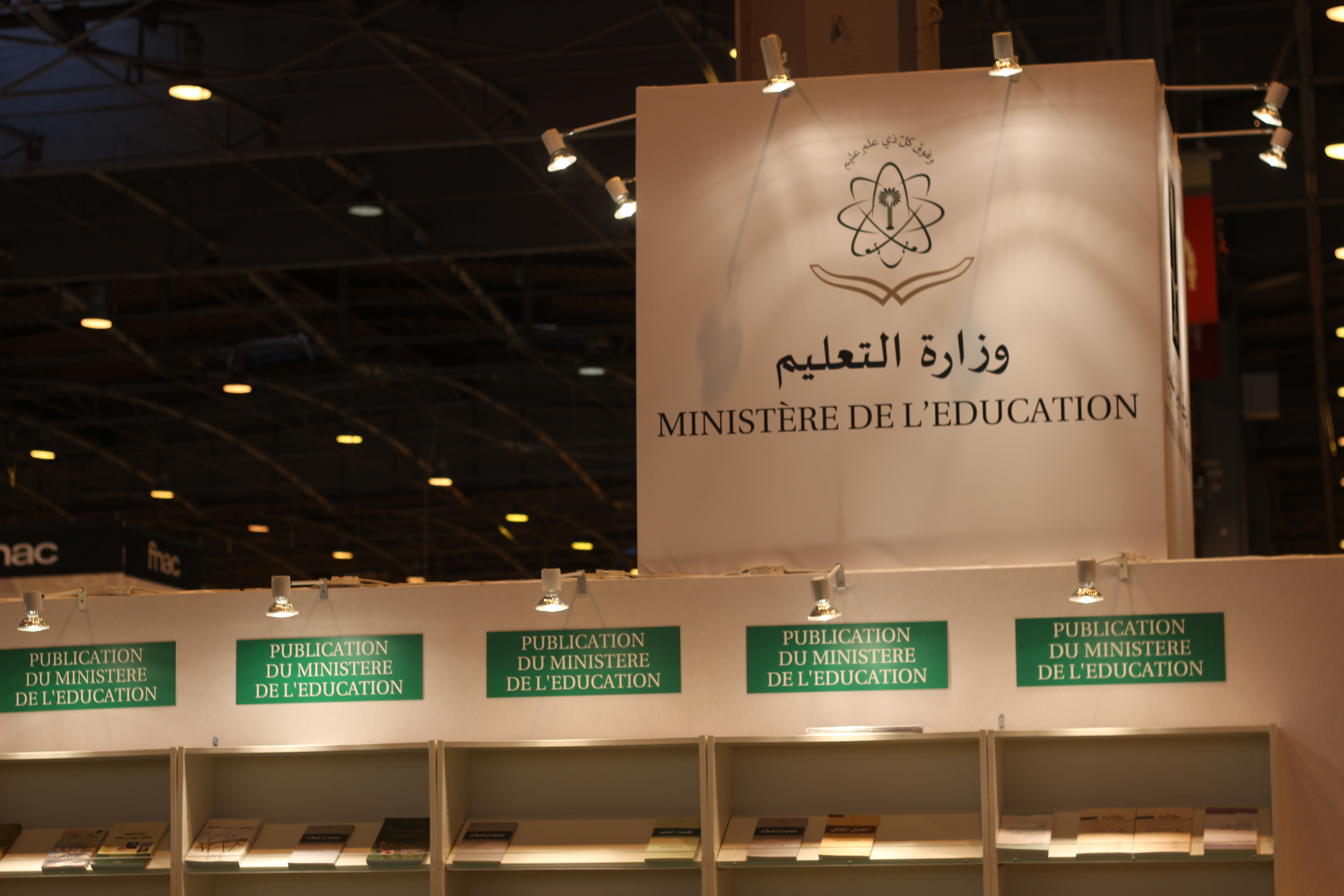
Stand of the Ministry of Education of Saudi Arabia at the Paris Book Festival in 2015.

- Fahd bin Abdulaziz Al Saud (1953–1962)
- Abdulaziz bin Abdullah Al Khwaiter (1976–1996)
- Abdullah bin Saleh bin Obaid (2005–2009)
- Faisal bin Abdullah bin Mohammed Al Saud (2009–2013)
- Khalid bin Faisal Al Saud (2013–2015)
- Ahmed bin Mohammad Al Issa (2015–2018)
- Hamad bin Mohammed Al Al-Sheikh (2018–2022)
- Yousef bin Abdullah Al-Benyan (2022–present)

== Achievements ==
In September 2018, the Ministry of Education and Arizona State University partnered with each other in order to launch Building Leadership for Change Through School Immersion program which would commence from February 2019.

== See also ==
- Ministries of Saudi Arabia
