= Higher education in Saudi Arabia =

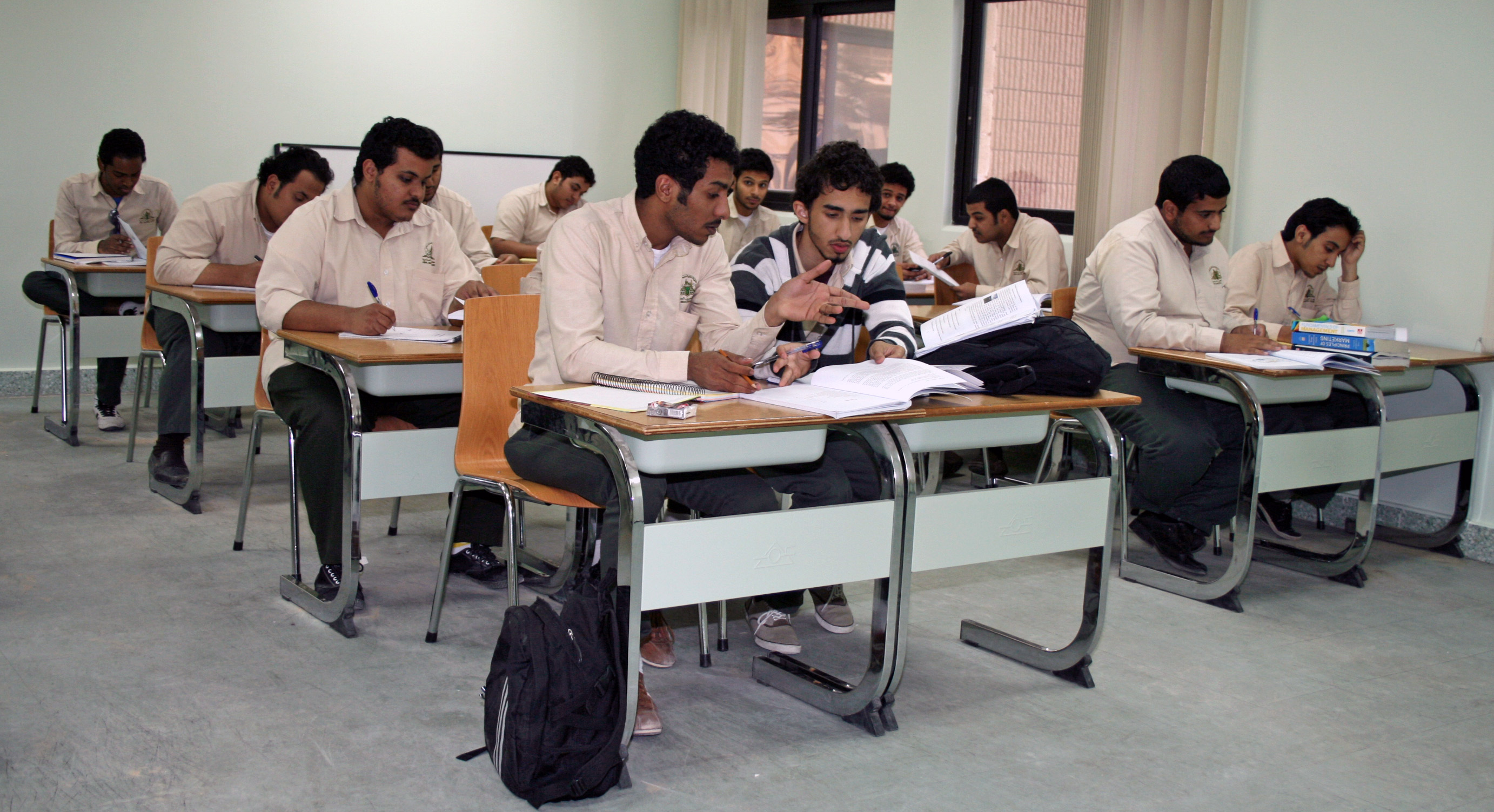
Saudi students at Jubail Industrial College

Higher education in Saudi Arabia is the educational stage that follows the three years of secondary education. Higher education institutions are either governmental institutions or private institutions, and are mainly universities, colleges, and academies. There are three higher educational levels in Saudi Arabia: bachelor's degree, master's degree, and doctorate. Governmental universities in Saudi Arabia offer a free bachelor's degree education for Saudis and a monthly payment for each student during their studying period.

A bachelor's degree in Saudi Arabia takes four years in humanities and social science majors; in medicine, pharmacology, engineering and applied sciences majors, it takes between five and six years of study. King Saud University was established in 1957; the establishment of this university marked the beginning of the contemporary higher education in Saudi Arabia. King Saud University is the first established university in Arab States of the Persian Gulf.

According to the governmental records, the number of Saudi students who registered for higher education in 2006 was 636,000 (268,000 were males, and 340,657 were females). 528,146 of them applied for a bachelor's degree, 9,768 applied for a master's degree, and 2,410 applied for a doctorate. In addition, 93,968 students applied for an intermediate diploma, and 1,953 students applied for a higher diploma.

UNESCO Global Education Monitoring Report showed that in 2022 the tertiary enrollment in Saudi was 1.57 million. In 2024, the World Bank and UNESCO institute for Statistics (UIS) reported an 84% tertiary gross enrollment ratio for Saudi Arabia. In 2025, 46% of people in Saudi Arabia between the ages of 25-34 had completed a higher education, of which 65% were Saudi nationals.

== History ==
The entrance gate of King Saud University, the kingdom's oldest university, founded in 1957

The Saudi Ministry of Higher Education was established in 1975, becoming the entity responsible for managing and laying the foundation of higher education in the kingdom. In 2015, the Ministry of Higher Education was merged with the Ministry of Education and became the Ministry of Education.

Established in 1949, the College of Shariah and Islamic Studies in Makkah is the first higher educational institution in Saudi Arabia. King Saud University is the first modern university in Saudi Arabia. It was established in 1957 with only the Faculty of Arts and 21 students. Now the university has many faculties including college of Arts, Applied Sciences, Faculty of Engineering, College of Business Administration, Faculty of Computer Science and Information, College of Medicine, Pharmacology, College of Languages and Translation.

In December 2019, Saudi Arabia passed a new Universities Bylaw, which allowed for more financial and administrative autonomy for public universities and the Universities Affairs Council was created to replace the Higher Education Council.

The number of graduates between 2009 and 2020 showed increases in the fields of engineering, with an increase from 4% to 11%, business administration increasing from 7% to 34%.

== Universities ==
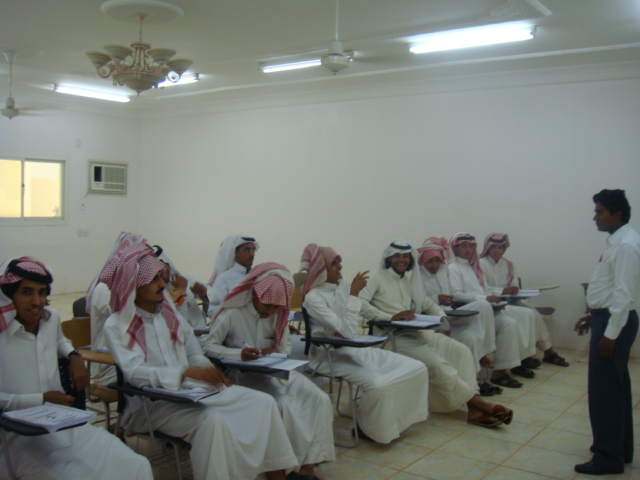
An instructor (far right) interacting with Saudi students in class at Najran University

There are more than 29 governmental universities, that consist of colleges and faculties that issue certificates and degrees in the BA, MA, and PhD levels in many majors. There are private colleges and community colleges that are a part of the governmental universities. There are also a number of academies around the kingdom, making four governmental technical colleges, 87 intermediate technical colleges, and more than 38 public and private universities and colleges. By 2024, there was a total of 93 higher education institutions in Saudi Arabia, including 57 private universities, 29 public universities, as well as 7 non-profit colleges and universities.

=== Research centers ===
Scientific research is one of the most prominent areas that the kingdom supports, being one of the ways to shift the national economy from depending on oil to becoming a more knowledge-based economy. There are more than 106 research centers in Saudi Arabia, the largest of which are King Abdulaziz City of Science and Technology (KAST), and King Abdullah City for Atomic and Renewable Energy (KA.CARE).

== Higher education for women in Saudi Arabia ==
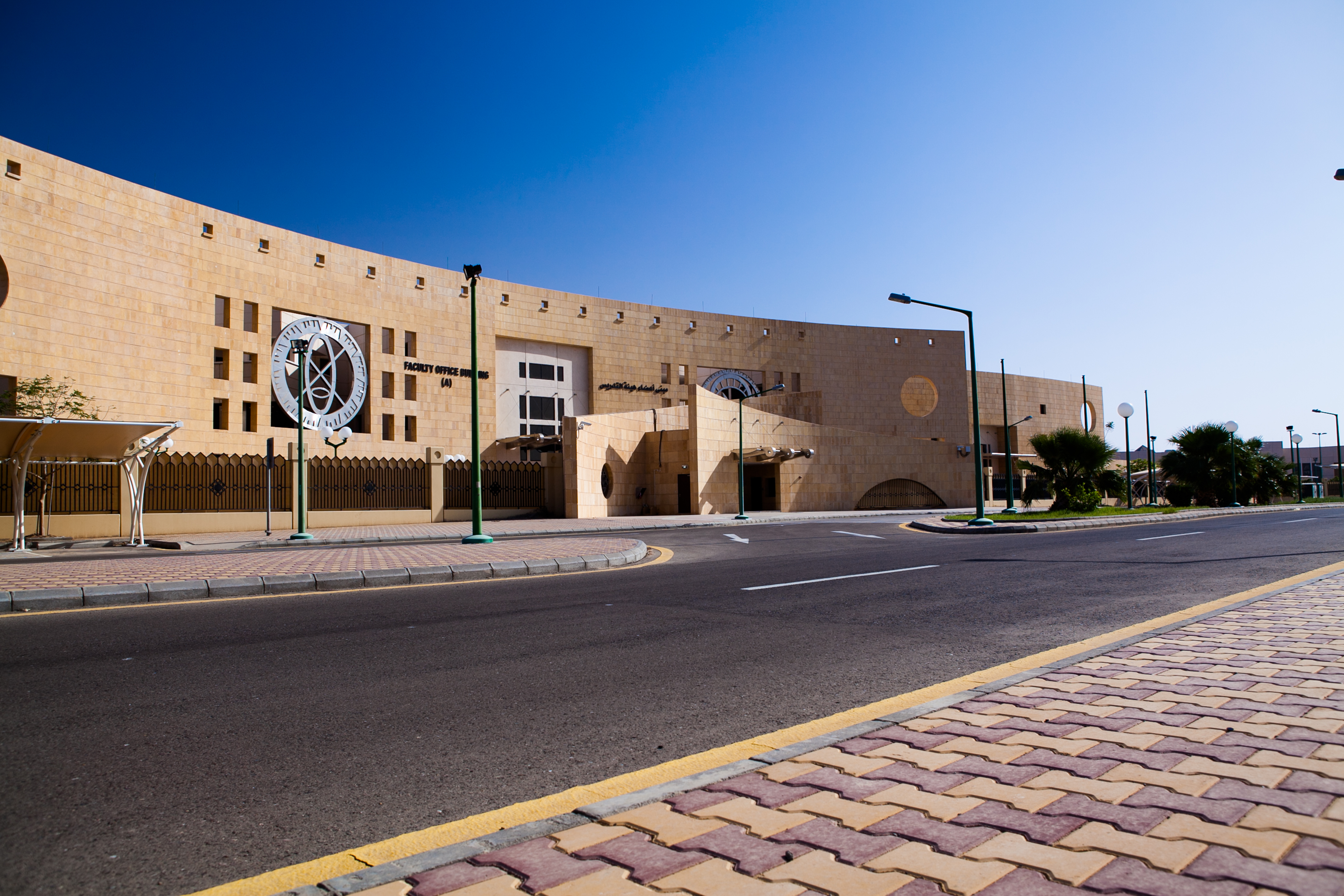
The women's campus for Yanbu University College

In 1976 the Higher Education Center for Women and several colleges of medicine and pharmacology for female students were established. In the late 1970s, the Saudi government offered more seats for Saudi female students to apply for higher education as a way of helping women achieve more at that time. According to the World Bank report, the number of Saudi female students in higher education outnumbered neighboring countries like Jordan, Tunisia, West Bank, and Gaza City.

More than 60% of Saudi university graduates are women. In Saudi Arabia, most women work in the educational sector, and there are thousands of Saudi women holding PhDs. In 2008, the first batch of Saudi women graduated from the Faculty of Law. In October 2013, four women were awarded legal licenses to practice law in courts.

In 2009, Nourah bint Abdullah Al-Fayz became the first female minister. Nourah is a former teacher who studied in the United States and was appointed as Deputy Minister of the Ministry of Education. Princess Nora University is the first college for women in Saudi Arabia and the largest globally, with 32 campuses around Riyadh city. In July 2020, Lilac AlSafadi was appointed as president of the Electronic University, making her the first female president of a Saudi university that includes both male and female students.

== Studying abroad ==
The Ministry of Education provides its contributions to prepare and help Human Resources efficiently, to become a competitor on a local and global level, thus providing both governmental and private Saudi universities with qualified personnel.

In 2005, King Abdullah bin Abdulaziz established the King Abdullah Scholarship Program (KASP), sending Saudi youth abroad with full-ride scholarships to pursue higher education. A large portion of students involved in this program have gone to American universities, spurred by the 2006 agreement between King Abdullah and U.S. President George W. Bush which quintupled the amount of Saudis studying in the U.S. In 2017, the number of Saudi students studying abroad made up 5% of the total tertiary students. That number dropped after the KASP was scaled back so that there was a 39% decreased in enrollments abroad by 2019.

== Saudi Digital Library ==
The Saudi Digital Library is a massive digital library that contains more than 680,000 electronic books in many fields that support and meet the needs of beneficiaries in the higher educational sector in Saudi Arabia.

== See also ==
- List of universities and colleges in Saudi Arabia
- Education in Saudi Arabia
