= Riyadh College of Technology =

Public technical college in Riyadh, Saudi Arabia

- الكلية التقنية بالرياض
- Type: Public
- Established: 1983; 43 years ago
- Parent institution: Technical and Vocational Training Corporation
- Provost: Fahad Al-Zamami
- Faculty: 700+
- Students: 8,000+
- Location: Riyadh, Saudi Arabia; 24.730°N 46.704°E
- Colours: Green; Blue; Yellow
- Mascot: Gear
- Website: www.rct.edu.sa

Riyadh College of Technology (RCT) (Arabic: الكلية التقنية بالرياض) is a public institute of technology in Riyadh, Saudi Arabia. It was established in 1983 during the reign of King Fahd bin Abdulaziz and is the first intermediate technical college in Saudi Arabia. It was founded under the supervision of Saudi Technical and Vocational Training Corporation and offers courses in multiple streams like electrical, electronics, automobile and management technology.

During the first six years of implementation of the diploma program, the Technical and Vocational Training Corporation (TVTC) was in need for technical trainers to work in its technical institutes. Therefore, the corporation adopted the idea of applying Bachelor program to rehabilitate the distinguished graduates of the diploma program in technical college to work in the field of training in industrial secondary institutes and technical colleges. In 10/06/1409H, a royal decree was issued (M/194/7) to develop the intermediate technical college in Riyadh and the duration of training period for four years to granting bachelor's degree in the technical engineering and give graduates the same privileges granted to graduates of engineering schools in the Kingdom.

== Academic departments ==
=== Administrative Technology Dept ===
With the rapid economic growth in different fields, the human is the basic factor to obtain the objectives of the government and private institutions, so, the administrative technology department responds to the requirements of the labor market in the fields of office management, accounting and marketing. The department grants Diploma degree in office management and accounting in addition to the specialty of marketing. The training process is based on a plan related to the scientific fact and the trainees use computer and developed educational programs in the training and rehabilitation programs to acquire the applied scientific skills with theoretical background needed by the employee in the administrative fields

=== Chemical Technology Dept ===
Chemical Technology Department is an essential part in Riyadh College of Technology and the only in the Kingdom. It is considered as one of the pillars of development plans for preparing the capable cadres scientifically and practically to deal with the modern chemical techniques in adverse industrial fields. The department grants the Diploma and Bachelor certificates in the specialties of chemical laboratory and chemical production technology. The training process in this department based on growth plans and the needs of the national market by using laboratories equipped with the latest devices and facilities.

=== Civil and Architectural Technology ===
Civil and Architectural Technology Specialty is one of the modern specialties in the college, which grants Diplomas in the fields of Civil Technology and Architecture Technology. The training is designed to graduate an assistant engineer with a highly skilled for the work in the construction industry in the public or private sector in the Kingdom. It aims to teach the graduate a variety of work fields in the civil and architectural activities (such as: management of construction sites and drawing by computer and the supervision of buildings ...) where preparation of the plan and curricula based on the requirements of the labor market.

=== Computer Dept ===
The department aims to prepare a technical staff capable of dealing with modern technologies in the field of computer and information systems at the governmental and private sectors. It grants Diploma certificate in Computer specialty, technical support and software in addition to specialty of computer networks. The Computer Department also rehabilitates and train the trainee on all skills associated with the world of the computer.

=== Electrical Technology Dept ===
Electrical Technology Department aims to prepare the technical cadres capable of increasing productivity and efficiency of the equipments and electrical appliances and keep pace with the rapid technical progress in the electrical fields. It also studies and operates the networks of high-medium pressure and extensions within the factories and workshops in addition to installing and operating the electrical machinery and applying the modern protection methods in order to support development plans in the field of electricity services throughout the Kingdom. The equipments of laboratories and workshops are a unique model for the practical training environment designed to give extensive experience and high skills for the graduate in his specialization and thus qualify him for the scientific life.

=== English language Department ===
Due to the importance of English language in the technical sciences programs, and because of the increased English language courses in diploma and bachelor's programs, the college has established a center for English language to supervise the English language-training curricula and the intensive course in the Bachelor program. It also aims to contribute in raising the competency of college's trainers in this field through training courses and computer programs and other educational services.

=== Environment Technology Dept ===
The Environment Technology Department aims to prepare and qualify technicians in the food safety and health and environment protection as well as Vocational safety and health through two training programs for two years, the first to prepare the food inspectors, while the second to prepare technicians working in the environment, health and vocational safety fields. The department grants Diploma for the graduates of the two programs. The training plan has been prepared for the programs, as per a detailed study of the labor market showed the urgent need for professionals in these fields. Where these programs were adopted by the Ministry of Civil Service and identified the names of functions of the graduates from these programs.

=== Mechanical Technology Dept ===
Mechanical Technology Department aims to prepare Saudis professionals and technicians with the competency and efficiency in the required fields in the labor market. The training programs designed to cope with the latest technologies through practical training on the modern techniques by the advanced technology methods in the world that fit with the requirements of Saudi industry. The department grants diploma and bachelor's degrees in the specialty of industrial production technology, and engines and vehicles specialty as well as specialty of refrigeration and air conditioning technology.

=== Public Studies Dept ===
The Public Studies Department plays an effective role in supporting the other departments and provides the trainees with the public sciences to take up the specialized sciences offered by the other departments. From time to time, the department develops and modernizes the specialized curricula, to be compatible with specialized curricula the trainee taught in the technical departments. The department proposes the training plans and essential curricula and distributes those curricula, researches, lectures, and business training to the trainers. In addition, the department organizes public lectures and holding the courses and it includes the following divisions: Islamic culture and Arabic language, Mathematics and physics in addition to English Language.

== Academic system ==
The academic year is divided into three semesters, each of not less than fourteen weeks. Students are evaluated each semester prior to being advanced.

== See also ==
- Education in Saudi Arabia
- List of technical colleges in Saudi Arabia
