= Al-Watania Poultry Institute of Technology =

Technical institute promoting poultry education in Saudi Arabia

AL Watania Poultry Institute of Technology
- معهد دواجن الوطنية للتقنية
- Seal of the WIT
- Motto: To be the first choice for current and future employees and entrepreneurs in the poultry industry and support services
- Type: Strategic Partnership Institute
- Established: 2014
- Academic staff: 50
- Students: 800+
- Location: Bukayriyah, Al-Qassim Region, Saudi Arabia; 26.163583°N 43.720250°E
- Language: English

The Al Watania Poultry Institute of Technology (Arabic: معهد دواجن الوطنية للتقنية) is established as a result of strategic partnership of Technical and Vocational Training Corporation and Al-Watania Poultry Co. in Saudi Arabia. This is a non-profit institute developed in the kingdom to promote the technical education in the field of poultry production and support services.

== Overview ==
This is sole initiative of Al-Watania Poultry Co. to establish this institute. Al-Watania Poultry is one of the largest companies in the world producing poultry meat and its products, and is located 25 kilometers north of Buraidah in Al-Qassim Region.

== Programs ==
The institute offers the following programs:

- Full diploma in poultry production
- Associate diploma in poultry production
- Short courses in different poultry related fields
