= Buraidah College of Technology =

Technological college in Buraidah, Al-Qassim, Saudi Arabia

Coordinates: 26°20′36″N 43°57′9″E

- الكلية التقنية ببريدة
- Type: Public
- Established: 1987
- Provost: Saleh Mohammad Al-Nasiri
- Dean: Mansour bin Ebrahim
- Location: Buraidah, Al-Qassim, Saudi Arabia
- Colours: Green Blue Yellow
- Mascot: Gear
- Website: http://www.tvtc.gov.sa

The Buraidah College of Technology was established in 1407H/1987 as the first college of technology in the Kingdom of Saudi Arabia. Its first objectives and priorities were to prepare qualified technical cadres for work in technical industries. During the first six years of implementation of the diploma program, the Technical and Vocational Training Corporation TVTC was in need for technical trainers to work in its technical institutes. Therefore, the corporation adopted the idea of applying bachelor program to rehabilitate the distinguished graduates of the diploma program in technical colleges to work in the field of training in industrial secondary institutes and technical colleges.

== See also ==
- Technical and Vocational Training Corporation
- List of technical colleges in Saudi Arabia
