= List of technical colleges in Saudi Arabia =

This is a list of technical colleges in Saudi Arabia that are governed by the Technical and Vocational Training Corporation (TVTC).

== Technical colleges ==
- Ahsa Technical College
- Al-Rass Technical College
- Arar Technical College
- Baha Technical College
- Bisha Technical College
- Buraidah Technical College
- Dammam Technical College
- Dwadmi Technical College
- Food & Environment College in Buraidah
- Gurayat College of Technology
- Hafr Al-Batin Technical College
- Hail Technical College
- Jeddah College of Telecom & Electronics
- Jeddah Technical College
- Jouf Technical College
- Khamis Mushait Technical College
- Kharj Technical College
- Madinah College of Tourism & Hospitality
- Madinah Technical College
- Majmaah Technical College
- Makkah Technical College
- Najran Technical College
- Qatif Technical College
- Qunfudah Technical College
- Quwaiya Technical College
- Riyadh College of Telecom & Information
- Riyadh Technical College
- Tabuk Technical College
- Taif Technical College
- Unaizah Technical College
- Wadi Addawasir Technical College
- Yanbu Technical College
- Zulfi Technical College
- Saudi Mining Polytechnic

== See also ==
- List of universities and colleges in Saudi Arabia
- Technical and Vocational Training Corporation
