= Dammam College of Technology =

Governmental technical college located in Saudi Arabia

- Type: Public
- Established: 1986; 40 years ago
- Parent institution: TVTC
- Location: Dammam, Saudi Arabia; 26.386°N 50.118°E

Dammam College of Technology is a governmental technical college located in Dammam, eastern Saudi Arabia, was founded in 1986. The college mainly focuses on technical and vocational training to prepare students for careers. It is one of the technical colleges that are governed by the Technical and Vocational Training Corporation (TVTC), the government provider of training in the kingdom.

DCT offers a range of technical and vocational programs in various fields of study, including engineering technology, information technology, business administration, industrial technology, and health sciences.

In April 2019, a trainee from this college won an award in 47th International Exhibition of Inventions of Geneva, for an invention about power generation from the sand.

== Programs ==
This college offers a variety of degree programs including electronic technology, mechanical technology, civil and architectural technology, management and business technology, and electrical technology.

== See also ==
- Technical and Vocational Training Corporation
- List of technical colleges in Saudi Arabia
