= Buraydah, Saudi Arabia =

Buraidah بريدة
- City
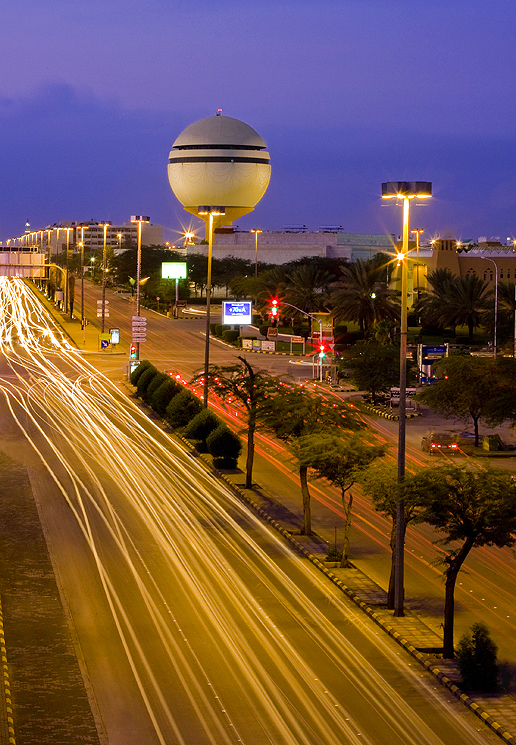
- View of Buraidah

- Location in Saudi Arabia
- Coordinates: 26°20′N 43°58′E
- Country: Saudi Arabia
- Province: Al-Qassim Province
- Established: 1577

Area
  - City: 1,291 km^{2} (498.3 sq mi)
  - Metro: 15,060 km^{2} (5,810 sq mi)
- Elevation: 650 m (2,130 ft)

Population (2022 census)
  - City: 571,169
  - Density: 442.6/km^{2} (1,146/sq mi)
  - Metro: 677,647 (Buraidah Governorate)

GDP (PPP, constant 2015 values)
  - Year: 2023
  - Total (Metro): $41.2 billion
  - Per capita: $57,700
- Time zone: UTC+3 (AST)
- Postal code: 52581
- Area code: +966
- Website: www.alqassim.gov.sa

Buraidah (Arabic: بريدة; also spelled as Buraydah) is the capital and largest city of Al-Qassim Province in north-central Saudi Arabia. The city is regarded as the agricultural capital of Saudi Arabia and has been described as the Kingdom's breadbasket due to the diversity of its produce. Buraidah is particularly renowned for its date production, hosting one of the largest date markets in the world. In addition, its farms produce a variety of fruits and vegetables, including figs, strawberries, grapes, and pomegranates.

In 2021, Buraidah was recognized by UNESCO as a Creative City in Gastronomy, becoming the first Gulf city and the second Arab city to receive this designation.

== Notable landmarks ==
=== Buraidah Date Market ===
The Buraidah Date Market is the largest of its kind in the world and is located in the center of the city.

=== Museum of Buraidah ===
Located on King Abdul Aziz Road, it has separate days of operation for families and for single men, and features exhibits showcasing the area's heritage.

=== King Khalid Cultural Center and Garden ===
Located in the vicinity of the museum, this complex features a major public garden, Buraidah Garden.

=== Buraidah Water Tower ===
The Buraidah Water Tower is one of the most iconic landmarks in the city. It is a towering structure that stands at a height of 40 meters and has a capacity of 5,000 cubic meters of water. The tower serves as a vital source of water for the residents of Buraidah, and it has become a symbol of the city's progress and development over the years. It is open to visitors during the summer festival. The nearby central city park is a popular excursion destination all year round.

=== Buraidah Camel Market ===
The Buraidah Camel Market, also known as Al-Qassim Camel Market, is the largest of its kind in the world and is situated on the outskirts of Buraidah in Al-Qassim, with thousands of camels for sale.

== Transportation ==
=== Roads ===
Highways link Buraidah to the major cities surrounding it. It is 317 kilometers by highway to get to Riyadh, 450 km to get to Medina, and 250 kilometers to get to Ha'il. One can travel up to the border of Jordan in a dual network of roads.

=== Rail ===
There is now a railway line starting from Riyadh to Qurayyat operated by SAR with a modern rail station located in the northeast of the city. There is a train station in Buraidah with direct trains to Riyadh, Al Majma'ah, and Hail, and from there to Al Jouf as well.

Services at Qassim station
- Preceding station	Saudi Arabia Railways	Following station
  Ḥaʼil towards Qurayyat	Riyadh–Qurayyat	Majmaah towards Riyadh North Station

=== Air ===
The Prince Nayef bin Abdulaziz International Airport, west of Buraidah, was built in 1964 and was expanded in 1964 over an area of 55,000 km2 with a capacity of 550,000 passengers. In 2009, international flights were launched. Flights to Dubai, Istanbul, Manama, Kuwait, and Cairo are scheduled regularly, along with domestic destinations.

== Climate ==
Buraidah has a hot desert climate (Köppen climate classification BWh), with long, extremely hot summers and short, very mild winters. Precipitation is very low, which falls almost entirely between November and May, leaving summers extremely dry.

Climate data for Buraidah (1991-2020)
Month	Jan	Feb	Mar	Apr	May	Jun	Jul	Aug	Sep	Oct	Nov	Dec	Year
Record high °C (°F)	32.4 (90.3)	35.0 (95.0)	40.0 (104.0)	43.0 (109.4)	46.0 (114.8)	47.5 (117.5)	48.4 (119.1)	49.0 (120.2)	48.0 (118.4)	43.0 (109.4)	37.0 (98.6)	31.0 (87.8)	49.0 (120.2)
Mean daily maximum °C (°F)	20.1 (68.2)	23.3 (73.9)	27.7 (81.9)	33.3 (91.9)	39.2 (102.6)	42.9 (109.2)	43.9 (111.0)	44.3 (111.7)	41.7 (107.1)	36.0 (96.8)	27.2 (81.0)	21.9 (71.4)	33.5 (92.3)
Daily mean °C (°F)	13.3 (55.9)	15.9 (60.6)	20.2 (68.4)	25.6 (78.1)	31.3 (88.3)	34.8 (94.6)	35.8 (96.4)	36.0 (96.8)	33.1 (91.6)	27.5 (81.5)	19.9 (67.8)	15.0 (59.0)	25.7 (78.3)
Mean daily minimum °C (°F)	6.7 (44.1)	8.7 (47.7)	12.7 (54.9)	18.0 (64.4)	23.1 (73.6)	25.6 (78.1)	26.5 (79.7)	26.8 (80.2)	23.9 (75.0)	19.0 (66.2)	13.3 (55.9)	8.5 (47.3)	17.7 (63.9)
Record low °C (°F)	−5.0 (23.0)	−2.4 (27.7)	1.0 (33.8)	8.5 (47.3)	13.0 (55.4)	19.0 (66.2)	19.0 (66.2)	19.8 (67.6)	14.7 (58.5)	10.7 (51.3)	1.5 (34.7)	−2.0 (28.4)	−5.0 (23.0)
Average precipitation mm (inches)	16.9 (0.67)	9.0 (0.35)	19.5 (0.77)	23.3 (0.92)	7.2 (0.28)	0.0 (0.0)	0.0 (0.0)	0.0 (0.0)	0.1 (0.00)	2.8 (0.11)	29.3 (1.15)	16.0 (0.63)	124.3 (4.89)
Average precipitation days (≥ 1 mm)	2.1	1.2	2.6	3.9	1.3	0.0	0.0	0.0	0.0	0.7	2.9	2.3	17
Average relative humidity (%)	53	45	36	34	27	16	16	15	17	23	42	52	31
Source 1: World Meteorological Organization
Source 2: Deutscher Wetterdienst (humidity, 1967–1980)

== Demographics ==
The city has experienced very high rates of population growth. In 2022, Buraidah officially counted a population of 571,169 within the city limits.

== Education ==
=== Public schools ===
General Administration of Education in the Qassim region enrolls over 118,589 students in primary, intermediate, and high public schools in Buraidah. These students are enrolled in 381 primary schools, 211 intermediate schools, and 131 public high schools. 9754 students are enrolled in 77 private schools. There are a number of international schools in Buraidah as well as many private kindergartens.

=== Colleges and universities ===
Central hall of the new Qassim University building in 2024

Qassim University is the largest higher educational institution in the Al-Qassim region, located in the west of Buraidah, where more than 70,000 undergraduate and graduate students attend 38 colleges. Qassim University is among Saudi Arabia's largest 29 public universities in terms of the number of students. Besides Qassim University, there are three private higher education establishments in Buraidah. Mustaqbal University is a private university where 1234 undergraduate students study in engineering, computer science, dentistry, and administrative and human sciences colleges. Buraidah College is another private higher education establishment where 2987 undergraduate students are enrolled in four faculties focused on dentistry, applied medical science, engineering and information technology, and administrative and human sciences colleges. The third private higher education institute is Al-Ghad International Health Sciences Colleges.

=== Vocational training colleges ===
In addition to the technical training high school, Buraidah College of Technology and the College of Food and Environment Technology are two technical colleges managed by the Technical and Vocational Training Corporation (TVTC). There are also the International Technical Colleges operated in cooperation between the TVTC and Laureate Vocational Saudi Arabia. Saudi Railway Polytechnic is a vocational training institute for railway technology located in the city.

=== Libraries ===
Besides Qassim University central libraries, which hold more than 2,200,000 items, King Saud Public Library is the main public library in Buraidah with around 30,000 titles, and is the oldest public library in Saudi Arabia. Sulaiman Al Rajhi Public Library and the Literary Club Library are two other libraries open to the public in the city.

== National Center for Vegetation Development and Combating Desertification ==
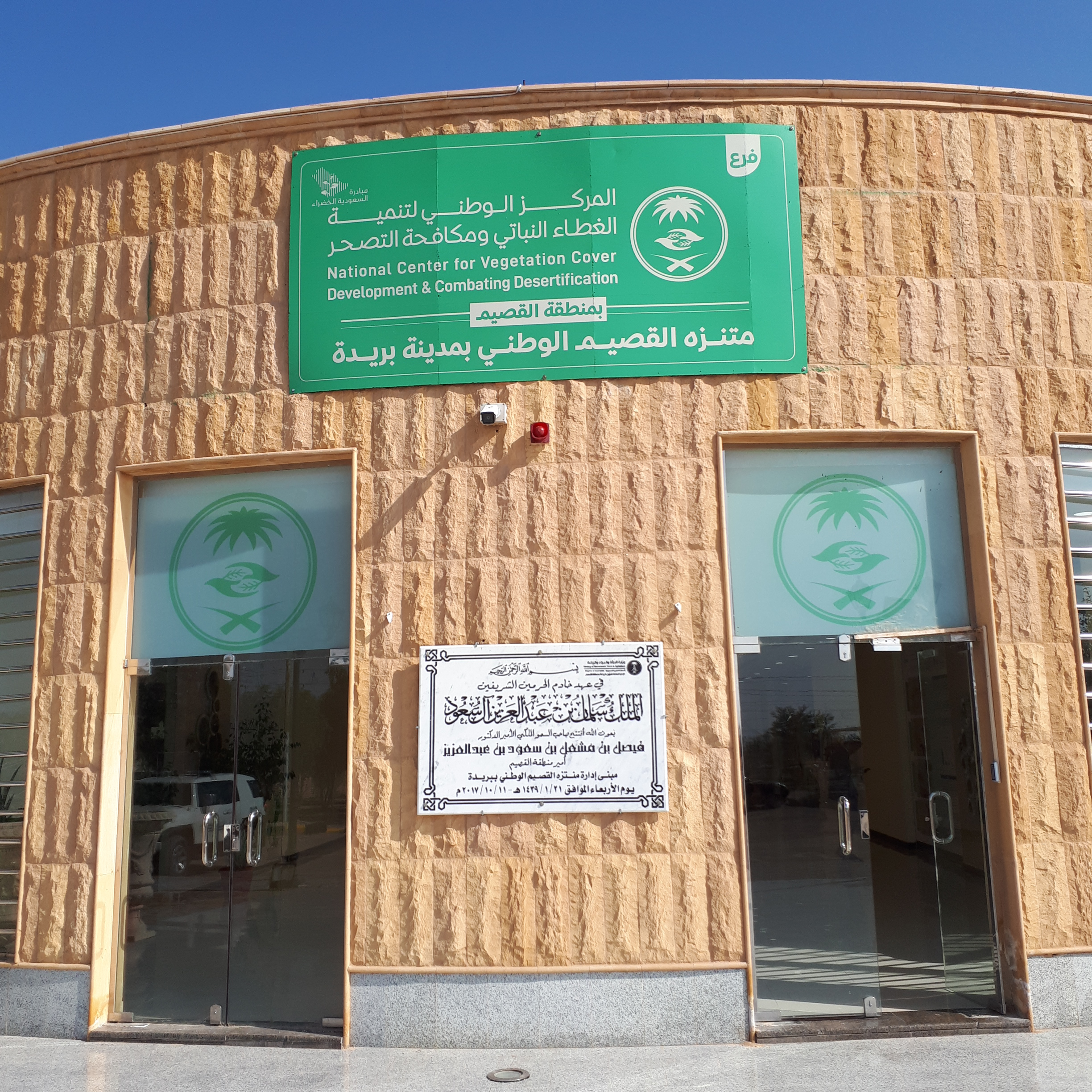
Entrance to the national center

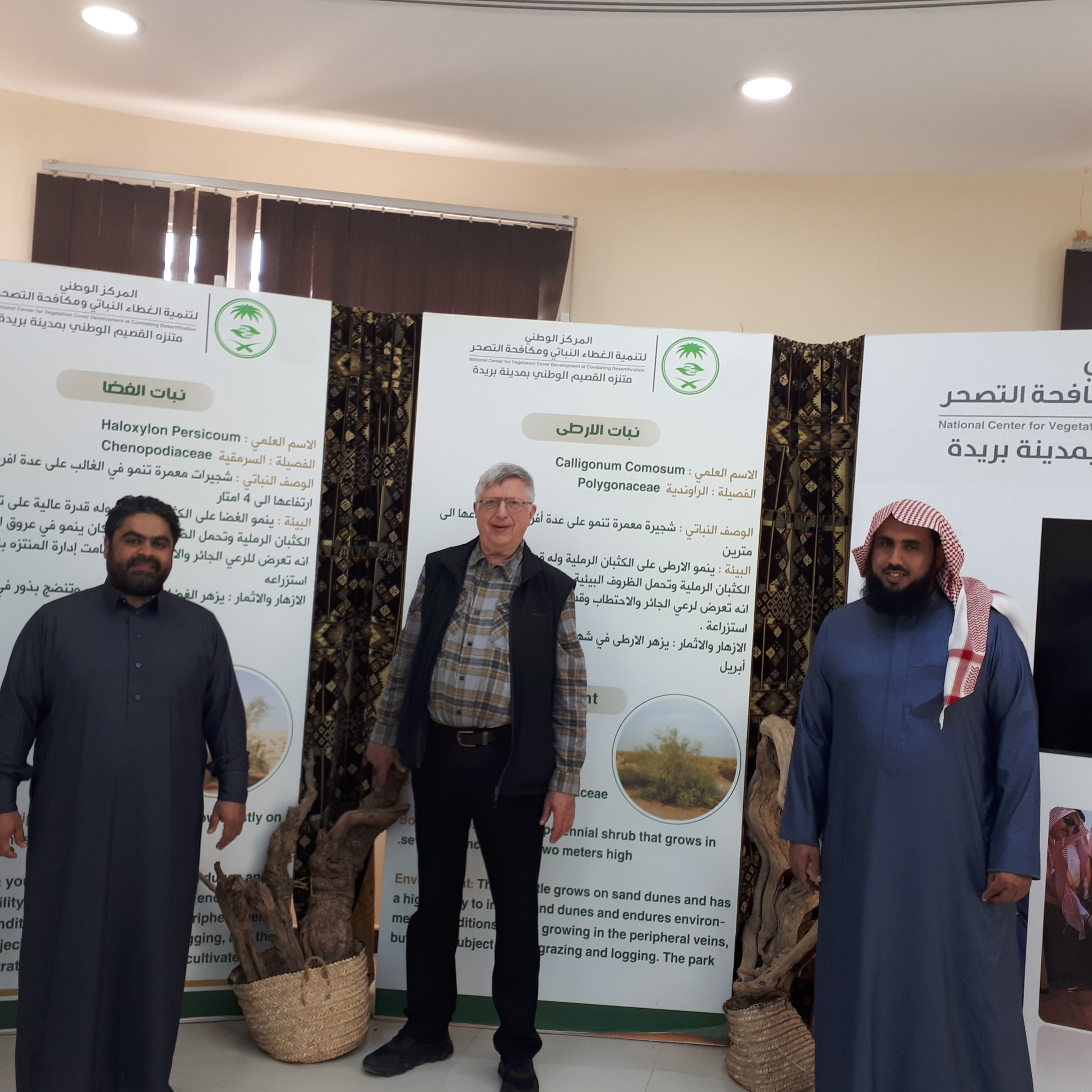
Exhibition at the national center

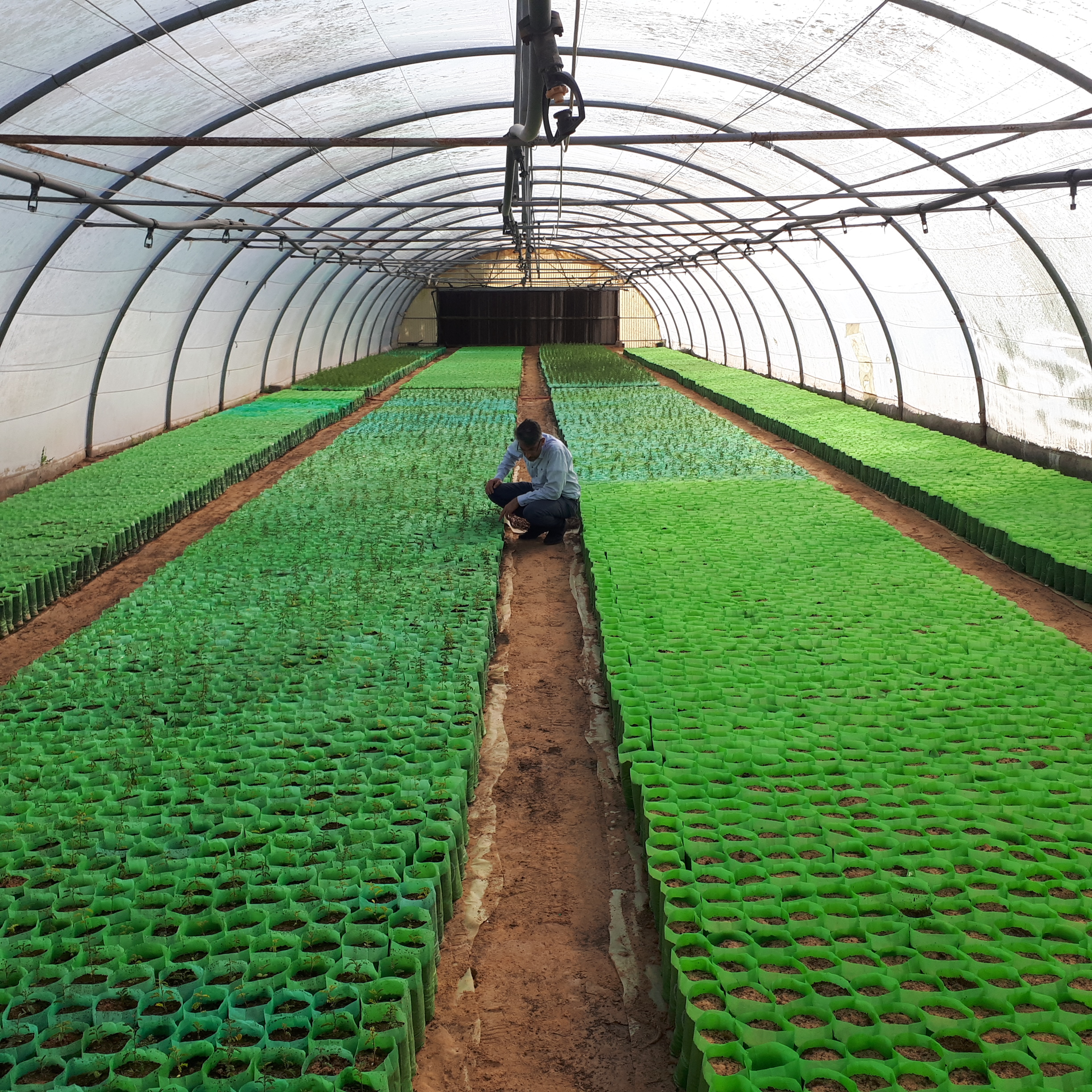
Greenhouses with tree seedlings at the national center

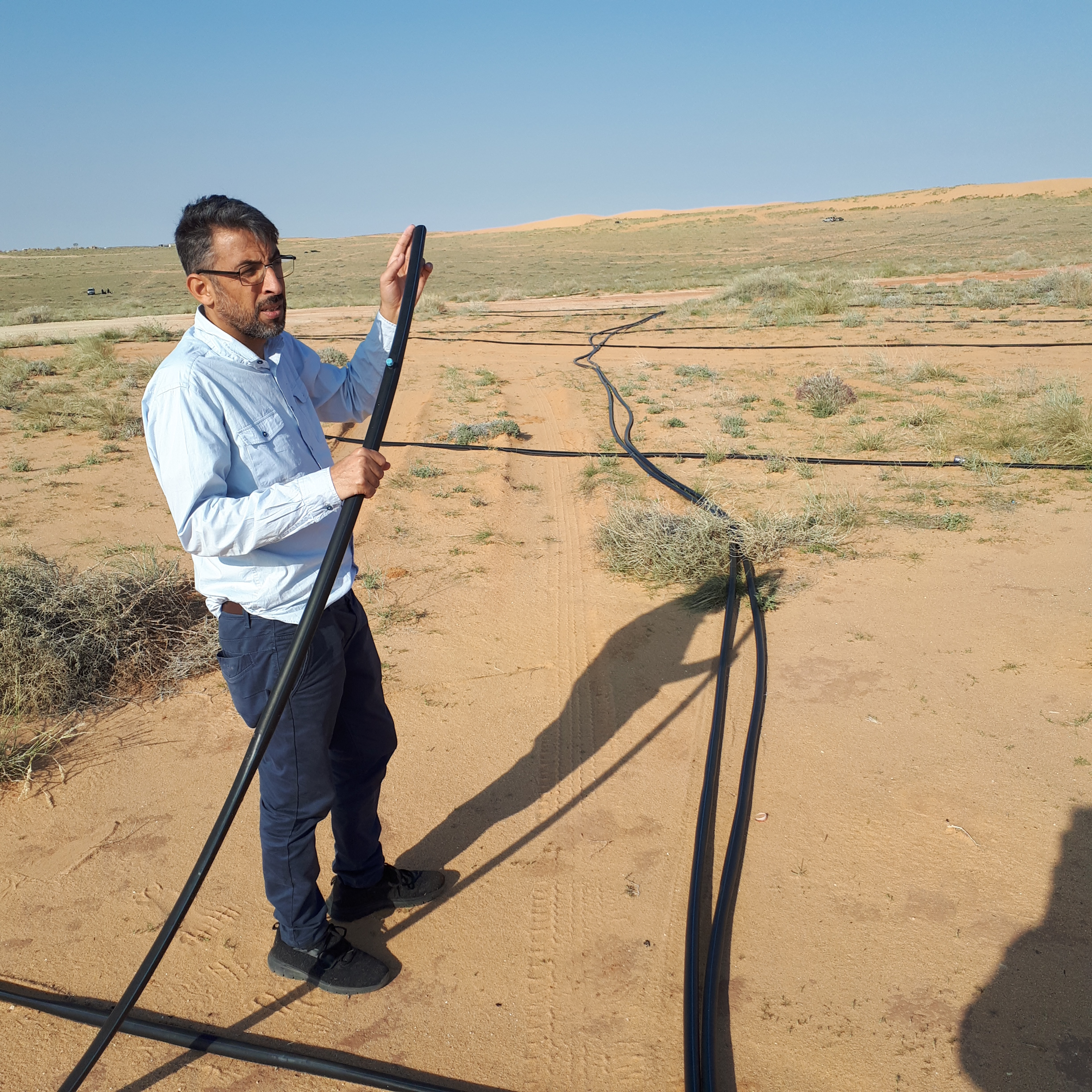
Drip irrigation system at the national center

The goals of the center are to increase green spaces, combat desertification, rehabilitate degraded vegetation sites, raise awareness among the population to reduce negatively impacting agricultural practices, and improve the quality of life. The campaign is in line with the mission of the National Center for Vegetation Development and Combating Desertification. The National Center, in collaboration with the National Water Company, has now completed the planting of one million trees in the Buraida oasis region. This oasis covers an area of more than 28 square kilometers in Al-Qasim province and contributes to the Saudi Green Initiative (SGI) with its goals of planting 10 billion trees through the national tree planting program. The private sector is crucial in all tree planting projects across the Kingdom. These projects, monitored by the Center, aim to reduce carbon dioxide emissions. In addition, they also focus on protecting local species' ecosystems from extinction and promoting sustainable practices.

To achieve this, the Vegetation Cover Center launched the National Tree Planting Program. This program operates in 13 regional branches in collaboration with the Ministry of Environment, Water, and Agriculture. It includes a wide range of participants – government, private sector, non-profit organizations, and volunteers. The common goal is to fulfill the objectives of the Saudi Green Initiative.

The center focuses on the development and protection of vegetation sites, monitoring, and rehabilitation of degraded areas, including the management and use of rangelands, forests, and national parks. It is also about minimizing interference with vegetation cover, combating deforestation across the Kingdom, and protecting natural resources and biodiversity.

== Notable people ==
- Abdullah Al Mudaifer
- Sulaiman Al-Alwan

== See also ==
- Qassim University
- Buraidah College of Technology
- List of cities and towns in Saudi Arabia
- Sawaj Mountain
