= Jeddah College of Technology =

Public technical college in Jeddah, Saudi Arabia

- Type: Public
- Established: 1986; 40 years ago
- Parent institution: TVTC
- Location: Jeddah, 22461, Saudi Arabia; 21.4117°N 39.3565°E

Jeddah College of Technology is a governmental technical college located in Jeddah, western Saudi Arabia, was established in 1986 as part of the Saudi government's plan to develop technical and vocational education and training in the country.

The college focuses on technical and vocational training to prepare students for careers. It is one of the technical colleges that are governed by the Technical and Vocational Training Corporation (TVTC), the government provider of training in the kingdom.

== Programs ==
This college offers a variety of degree programs including mechanical technology, civil and architectural technology, hotel technology and tourism and electrical technology. The college also offers internship and cooperative training programs in collaboration with various local and international organizations.

== See also ==
- Technical and Vocational Training Corporation
- List of technical colleges in Saudi Arabia
