= Abdullah Al Mudaifer =

Saudi Arabian TV show host

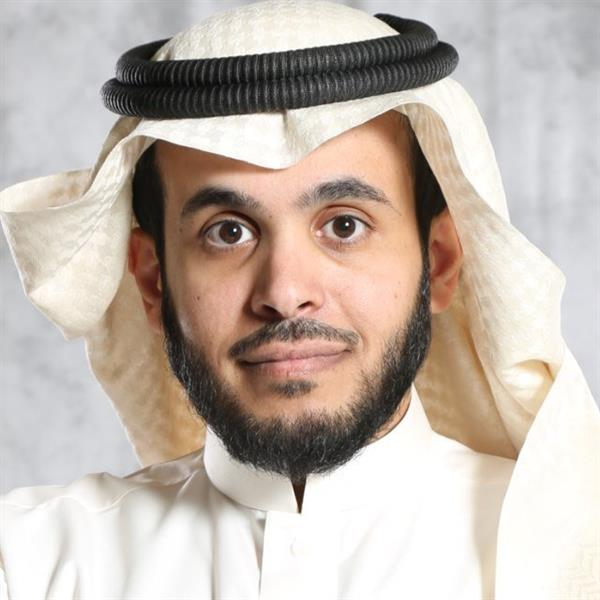
- Born: 1982 (age 43–44); Buraidah, Saudi Arabia
- Education: Bachelor's degree in Sharia and Law
- Occupations: TV presenter, actor, columnist, journalist
- Years active: Early 2000s–present
- Known for: Hosting Al Liwan and Al-Soura
- Notable work: The Orphan Emad, White Grudge

Abdullah Al Mudaifer (عبدالله المديفر born; 1982) is a Saudi Arabian TV presenter, actor, columnist and journalist. Recognized for his dynamic approach to television hosting, he has gained widespread acclaim through programs such as Al Liwan and Al-Soura, which air on Rotana Khalijiah channel and Rotana FM radio. His work spans a variety of topics including political, social, and cultural issues. He is also known for conducting high-profile interviews, including one with Crown Prince Mohammed bin Salman. Beyond his media career, Al Mudaifer holds a bachelor's degree in Sharia and Law, though he opted for a career in media over legal practice.

== Early life and education ==
Al Mudaifer, born in 1982 in the city of Buraidah, Saudi Arabia. He holds a bachelor's degree in Sharia and Law, though he later pursued a career in media rather than legal practice.

== Career ==
=== Television and Media ===
Abdullah Al Mudaifer is celebrated for his unique approach to television hosting. He has covered a wide range of topics, including political, social, and cultural issues. His programs, such as Al Liwan, have broken viewership records and trended globally on platforms like Twitter. He is also known for conducting high-profile interviews, including one with Crown Prince Mohammed bin Salman, becoming the third Saudi presenter.

Although his media career began with directing and starring in two religious films, which were criticized for their exaggerated and extremist themes, including the absence of women and music.

=== Programs ===
- Al Liwan (الليوان): A Ramadan special talk show featuring interviews with prominent personalities.
- Al-Soura (الصورة): A weekly program that delves into contemporary issues.
- Fi Al-Sameem

=== Filmography ===
- "The Orphan Emad"
- "White Grudge"

== See also ==
- Media in Saudi Arabia
