= Sawaj Mountain =

Mountain in Al-Qassim, Saudi Arabia

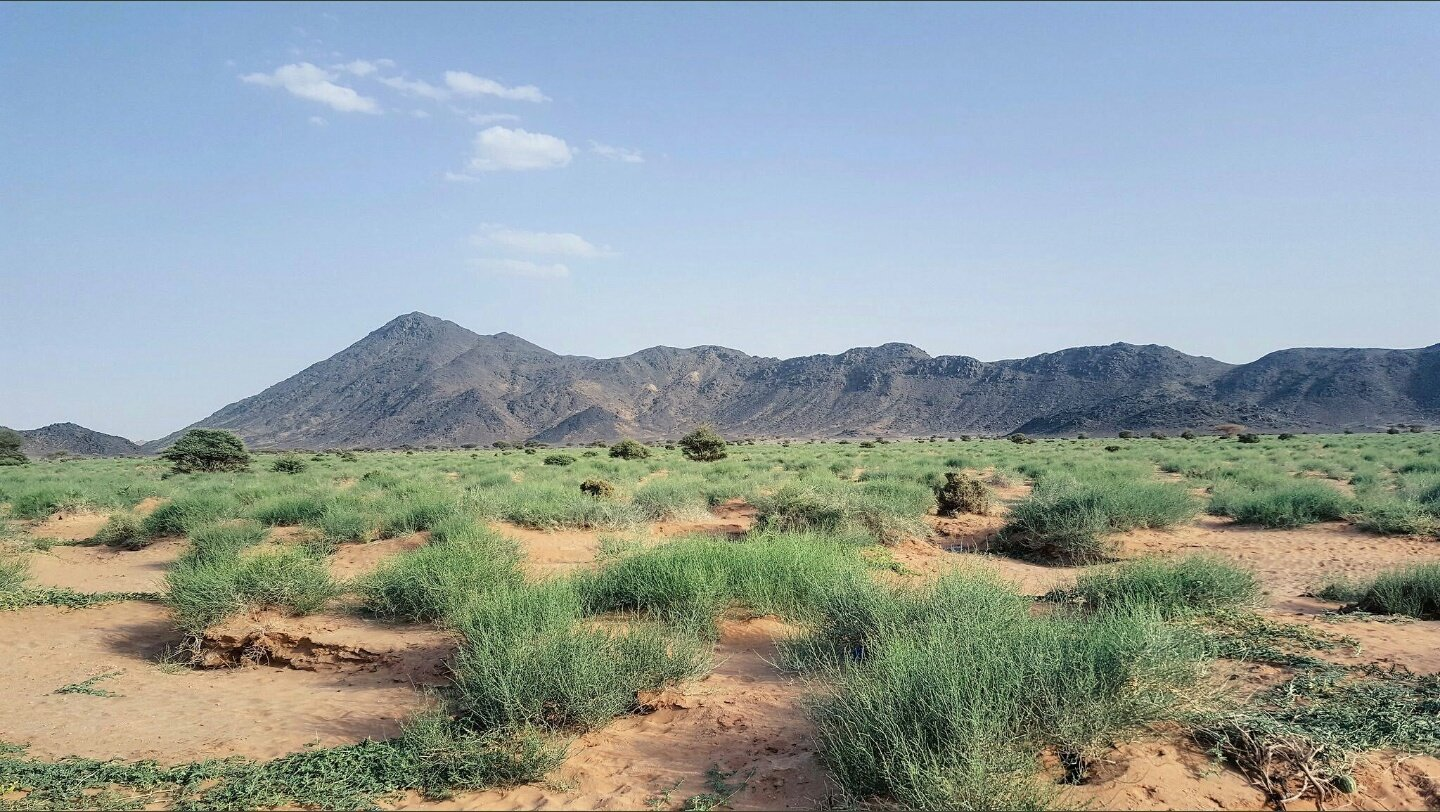

Highest point
- Elevation: 1,254 m (4,114 ft)

Geography
- Location: Al-Qassim, Saudi Arabia

Sawaj Mountain is one of the mountains in the Al-Qassim region, and one of the mountains of Hamma Dhiriyah, located in the southwestern part of Ar Rass Governorate. It contains drawings from the Thamudic period and is adjacent to the village of Al-Shabikiyah, which was formerly called Al-Tana'a. It is also located among a group of other mountains in Al-Qassim.

== History ==
Sawaj Mountain stands out from the surrounding mountain range due to the blackness of its volcanic rock, which have been referenced in poetic traditions dating back to Arab poets who have sung about them and mentioned them in their verses. The presence of Thamudian drawings on the rocks and within the caves of the mountain range suggests that its foothills were once a habitat for ibexes, camels, and cows. Additionally, second caliph, Umar ibn al-Khattab, designated the area as a headquarters for charity horses.

Sawaj is one of the mountains of the city of Hamma Dhiriyah in Qassim. It was known as "Sawaj Al-Hamma," in addition to other names such as "Sawaj Takhfa," due to its geographical location and the various appellations it has acquired over time. It is situated near Takhfa Mountain and is also referred to as "Sawaj Al-Tanaa" due to its proximity to the city of Al-Shabikiyah, which is located below the mountain and was also designated as "Sawaj Al-Khail". The mountain is distinguished by its dark black color and volcanic rocks, which differentiate it from the other mountains in the region. However, the southern side of the mountain contains red basalt rocks. Historical texts and references describe the mountain as "a rectangular black mountain from south to north." The mountain is referenced in the works of Arab poets, including Al-Nabagha Al-Ja'adi.

The mountain is situated on the southwestern periphery of Ar Rass Governorate, adjacent to the city of Al-Shabikiyah, which was previously designated as "Al-Tana'a." It is encircled by hills and mountains of Al-Qassim, and the mountain reaches an elevation of 1,254 meters above sea level. It is documented that Sawaj Mountain was the location of tribal settlements during both the Jahiliyya and Islamic eras. Among these tribes were the Banu Amira bin Khafafaf bin Amrou al-Qais, who resided there, as well as the Ghani tribe of Bahla. Some of these tribes still maintain a presence in neighboring villages, such as Nafi and Al-Athila. The region is currently inhabited by the Dhuba tribe, who are regarded as the sheikhs of the Banu Amr tribes from Harb. It has been documented that on the route to the mountain, there are ancient stone structures and appendages, which often conclude in circular piles of rocks that are believed to be graves.

== Geographical location ==
The site is situated in the city of Al-Shabikiyah, approximately 180 kilometers from Buraidah. Sawaj Mountain reaches an elevation of 1,254 meters above sea level. It is situated between the latitudes of 42.85°N and the longitudes of 16.43°E, with the northern border formed by the mountains of Al-Nai'ah, Al-Nu'ayy, and Al-Madari. To the south are the mountains of Laibiya, Jadala, Bir, and Rik, and to the east are the town of Shabikiya, the village of Rawdatayn, and Jabal al-Masouka. From the west, Fayadah Sawaj, Nafud al-Fanida, and Abraq al-Amala are in a state of abandonment. Additionally, valleies and reefs traverse the mountainous terrain, including, from the north, Shuaibi Fayadeh and Jabal al-Nuwayeh. To the south is Shuaib Mabhal, to the east are Shuaib Mubari, Mdisis, and Abu Nakhleh, and to the west are Shuaib Fayadah and Mabhal. The Basra pilgrimage route to Mecca traverses the southeastern slope of Sawaj Mountain.

== Climate ==
The climate is desert-like, with high temperatures and low precipitation during the summer months, and low temperatures and high precipitation during the winter. The average summer temperature is 45 degrees Celsius, while the average winter temperature is -3 degrees Celsius. The average annual precipitation is 145 mm.

== Monuments ==
The foothills of Sawaj Mountain are renowned for the presence of a group of drawings, writings, various inscriptions, and animal drawings, including ibexes, camels, cows, goats, ostriches, gazelles, and some predators, which date back to the Thamudic period. This is indicative of the prevalence of water and grasses at that time. Furthermore, some of its plateaus feature a series of lines and drawings within a series of caves, colored blue, red, and orange. On the opposing rock face, approximately fifteen meters in height, an archaeological painting has been carved into the rock formation. This is one of the largest known archaeological paintings in Qassim. However, researchers and history specialists from King Saud University have indicated that these invaluable inscriptions, drawings, and writings are susceptible to alteration by individuals who are unaware of their significance.

=== Al-Quser ===
A well and a water channel that served as a resting place for caravans traveling to the Old City. Its location is southeast of Al-Shabikiyah, in close proximity to the Sawaj Mountains.

=== Mutaashy Al-Raegha ===
The stone remnants of ancient palaces or the upper portions of a house, now buried beneath layers of dust, are situated in a southeastern location, proximate to the Sawaj Mountains and the city of Al-Shabikiyah.

=== Stone engravings ===
Stone carvings, animal drawings and waterfowl-like figures in the Sawaj Mountain, located northwest of Mutaashy Al-Raegha.

=== Warik well ===
Remains of the Well located near the petroglyphs.

== Carvings and drawings in the mountain ==
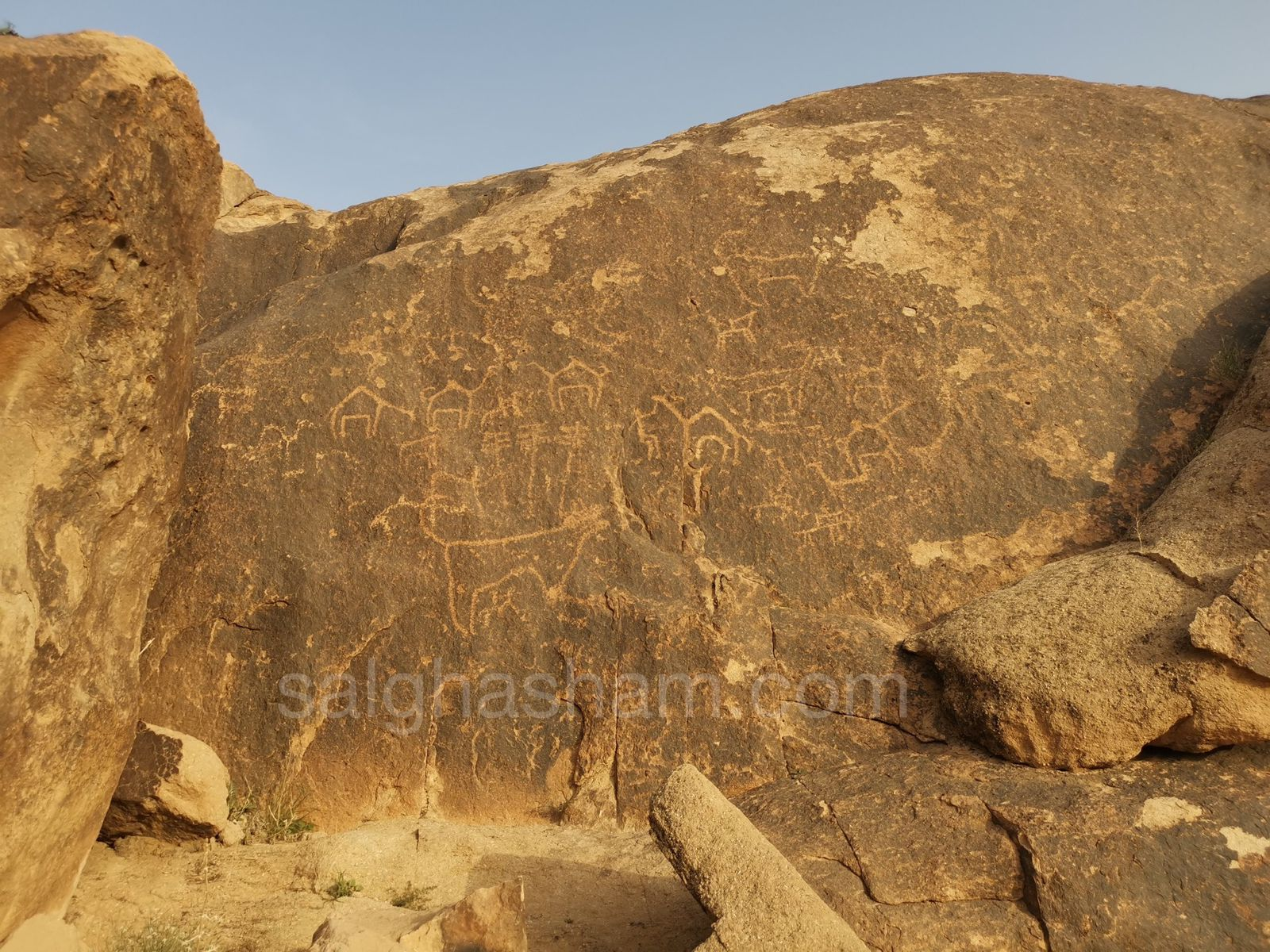

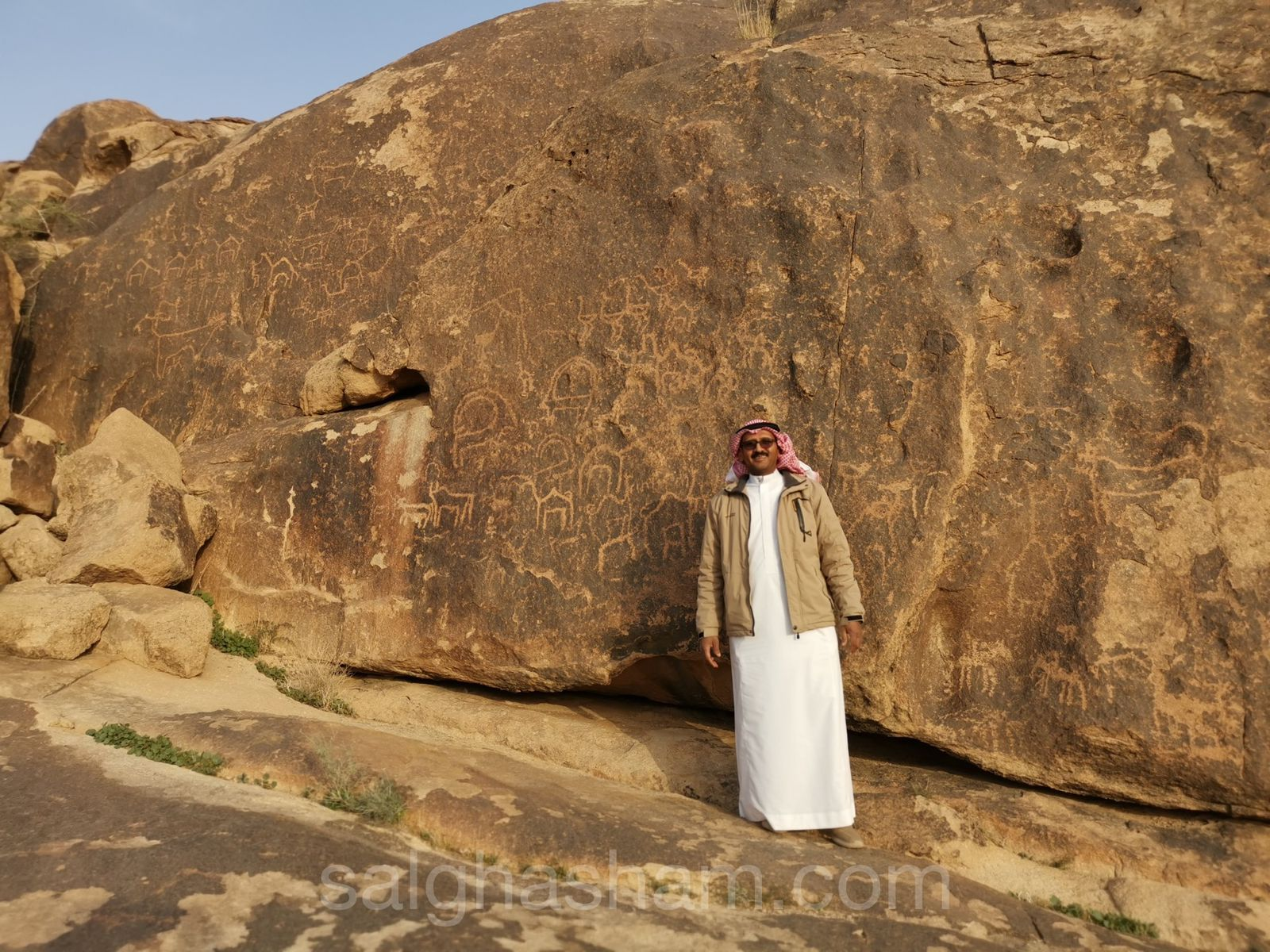

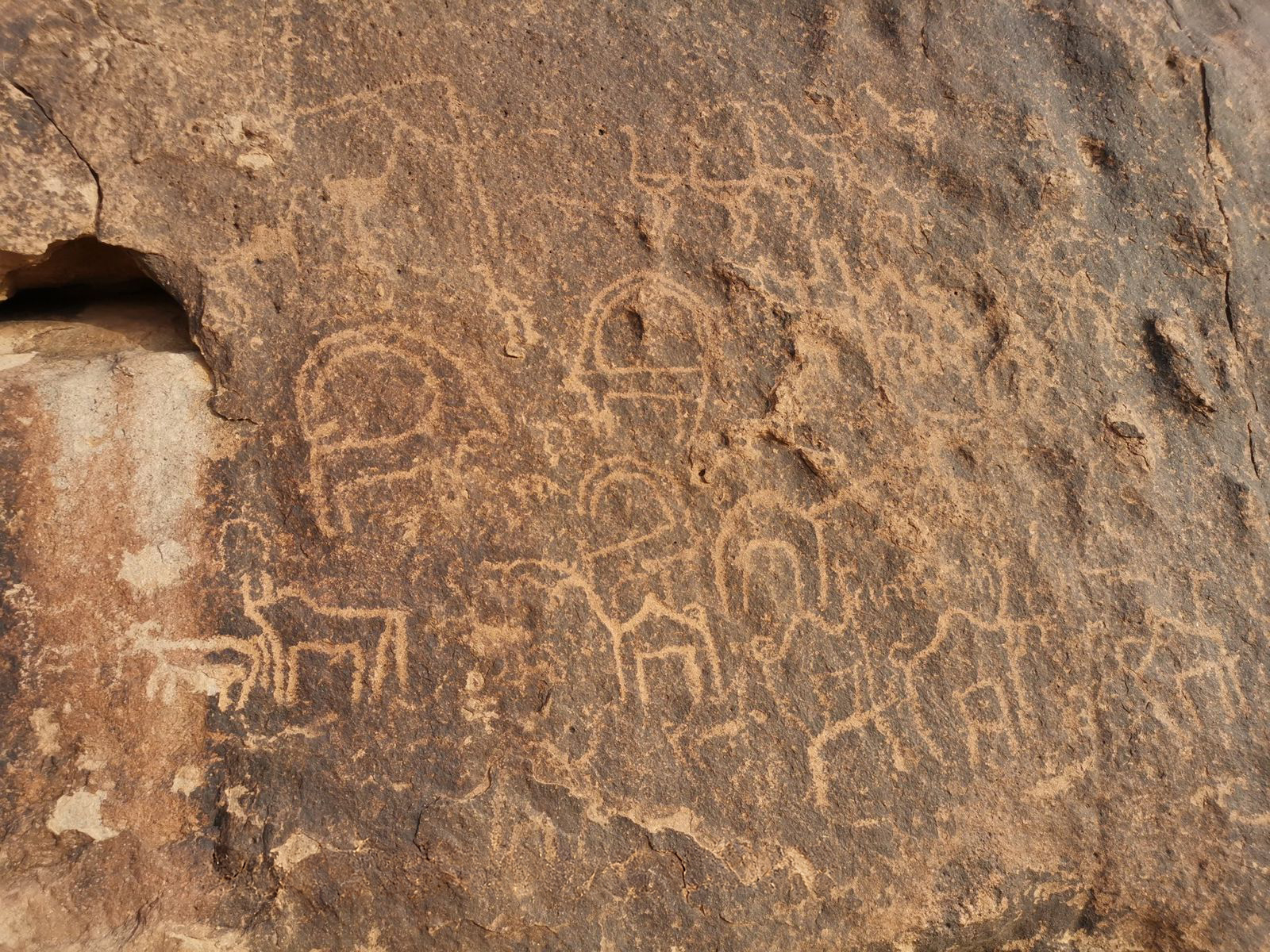

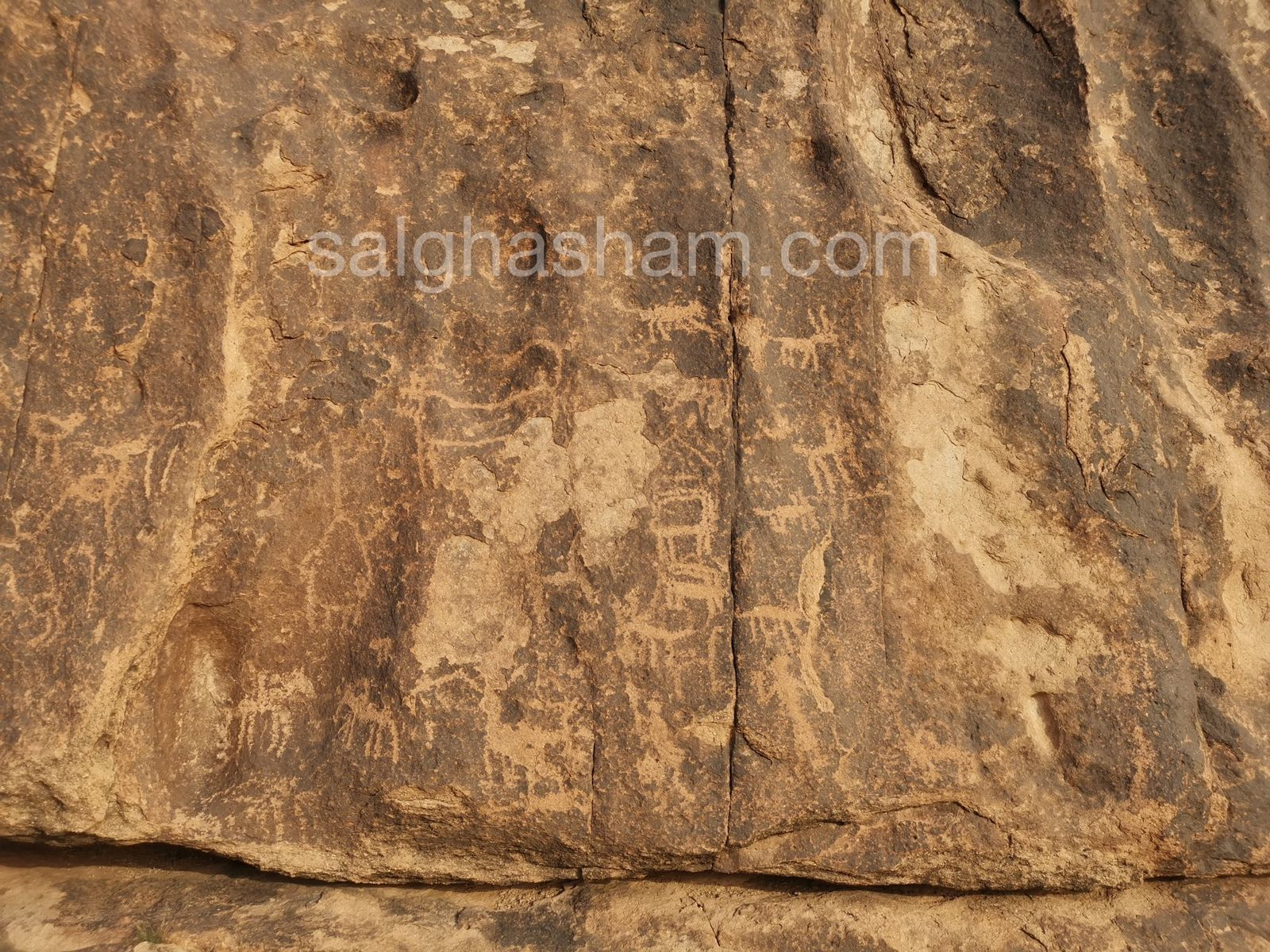

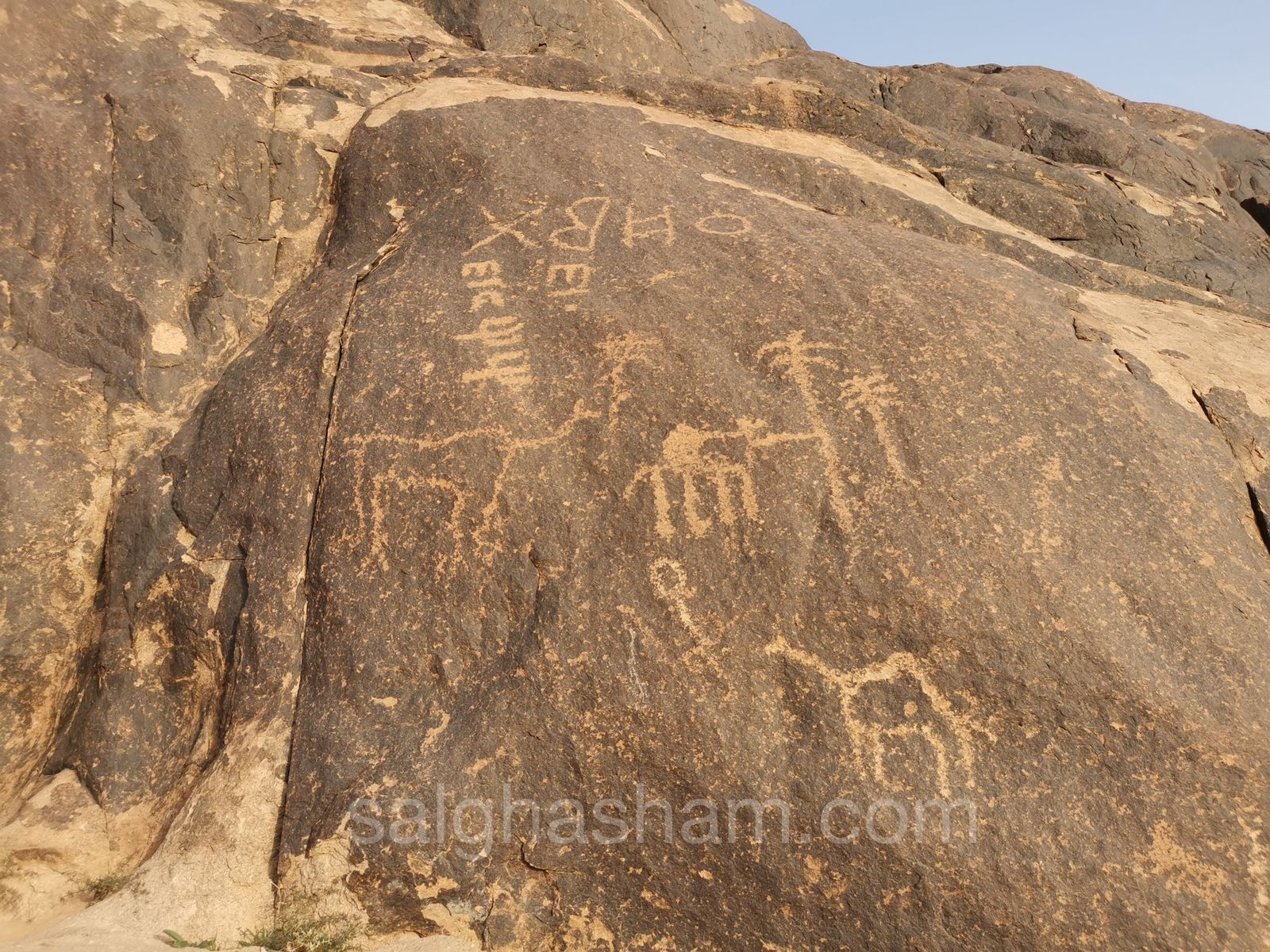
