= College of Food and Environment Technology in Buraydah =

College in Saudi Arabia

College of Food and Environment Technology in Buraydah (CFET)
- كلية الغذاء والبيئه ببريدة
- Other names: CFET
- Established: 1977; 49 years ago
- Location: Buraydah, Saudi Arabia
- Website: www.tvtc.gov.sa/arabic/trainingunits/collegesoftechnology/bfet/Pages/default.aspx

College of Food and Environment Technology in Buraydah (Arabic: كلية التقنية للغذاء والبيئة في بريدة) was founded in 1977 in Buraydah in Saudi Arabia. It was converted from the Technical Institute to Buraydah College Of Agricultural Technology in 2000, and last renamed in 2008 to College of Food and Environment Technology in Buraydah.

CFET offers Bachelor's and Master's degree programs in several areas of study, including Food Science and Technology, Nutrition, Environmental Science, Agricultural Engineering, and Horticulture. The college conducts research on various topics related to food, nutrition, and the environment.

== See also ==
- List of technical colleges in Saudi Arabia
- List of universities and colleges in Saudi Arabia
