= Al-Ghad International Health Sciences Colleges =

Coordinates: 26°27′1.85″N 50°4′59.59″E

- كليات الغد الدولية للعلوم الصحية
- Riyadh; Saudi Arabia

Information
- Type: private
- Established: 2009
- Founder: Sheikh Ibrahim bin Musa Al-zwaid
- President: Prof Mohammad Al-Kanhal
- Chairman: Sheikh Ibrahim bin Musa Al-zwaid
- Faculty: 770
- Enrollment: 7,000
- Website: www.alghadcolleges.edu.sa

Al-Ghad International Health Sciences Colleges (AIHSC, Arabic: كليات الغد الدولية للعلوم الصحية) are private Colleges headquartered in Riyadh, Saudi Arabia, founded in 2009 by his excellency Sheikh Ibrahim bin Musa Al-zwaid, Chairman of the Board of Trustees of the colleges, Al-Ghad Colleges are one of the first colleges in the kingdom providing education in Applied Health professions. The Colleges were created to meet the shortage of skilled health sciences workers in Saudi Arabia.

The student body of AIHSC today consists of about 7,000 students of both sexes. The colleges entails eight campuses spread around Saudi Arabia, with 770 faculty members.

== Al-Ghad Current undergraduate programs ==
• Preparatory Year Program

• Emergency Medical Specialists

• Medical Imaging Technology

• Health Services Administration

• Nursing

• Clinical Laboratory Science

== Al-Ghad Near future undergraduate programs ==
• Dentistry

== Accreditation ==
Programs at AIHSC are credited locally by:

• The Ministry of Higher Education in Saudi Arabia

• Under preparation to get accreditation from the Saudi National Commission for Academic Accreditation & Assessment (NCAAA)

• The Saudi Commission for Health Specializations

• King Abdullah Institute for Consultation Studies at King Saud University

The college is seeking accreditation from International accrediting agencies.
