= Technical and Vocational Training Corporation =

Training institute in Saudi Arabia

Kingdom of Saudi Arabia Technical and Vocational Training Corporation (TVTC)
- المؤسسة العامة للتدريب التقني و المهني

Agency overview
- Formed: 1980; 46 years ago
- Jurisdiction: Saudi Arabia
- Headquarters: Riyadh (Saudi Arabia)
- Agency executive: Ahmad Al-Faheed, Governor
- Website: http://tvtc.gov.sa

The Technical and Vocational Training Corporation (Arabic: المؤسسة العامة للتدريب التقني و المهني) (TVTC) is a training institute in Saudi Arabia. In existence since 23 June 1980, it has branches in all major Saudi cities.

The Technical and Vocational Training Corporation (TVTC) is a Saudi organization that provides technical and vocational training programs for males and females according to the quantitative and qualitative demands of the labor market. It is the government agency concerned with technical and vocational training in the Kingdom of Saudi Arabia since 1400 AH / 1980 AD. The Council of Ministers Resolution No. (268) dated Shaban 14, 1428 AH was issued to reorganize it and define its tasks and objectives.

The Technical and Vocational Training Corporation offers several training programs in its training facilities, as well as in strategic partnerships institutes and international technical colleges. In addition, it offers training programs in private training facilities, and flexible community support programs. The total number of TVTC facilities reaches 260, covering all parts of the Kingdom of Saudi Arabia.

== Beginnings ==
ReferencesSome researchers believe that the beginning of technical and vocational education was in the Hijaz, where multiple factors influenced the course of the educational movement in general, and technical and vocational education in particular. In 1328 AH / 1908 AD, an industrial school was opened in Makkah Al-Mukarramah, to which teachers were sent from Istanbul. One of the most important government schools that combined public education and technical education during the unification period of the Kingdom of Saudi Arabia was the Rasheediyya School, which was established between 1301 and 1303 AH / 1881-1883 AD. It used to teach the subjects of measurements, compound numbers, fractions, calligraphy, drawing, bookkeeping principles, arithmetic, flat and stereoscopic geometry, trigonometry, Islamic sciences, Arabic language, sociology, carpentry, blacksmithing, and Shoe manufacturing. Technical and vocational education was also started by establishing an Industrial school in Jeddah during the reign of King Abdulaziz in 1369 AH. The period of study there was three years after the primary school, then the study was altered to a five-year system after the primary stage, and it was called industrial secondary school. Then it was followed by the four-year system after primary school, and it was called the industrial intermediate school. The first industrial secondary school in the Kingdom was opened in 1380 AH / 1961 AD, and it was called the College of Industries.

== TVTC establishment and development ==
The beginnings of technical and vocational training in the Kingdom of Saudi Arabia go back to an early stage, as it was divided between three government agencies at that time:

- Secondary technical education (industrial, agricultural, and commercial) was correlated with the Ministry of Education.
- Vocational training (vocational training centers) was related to the Ministry of Labor and Social Affairs.
- The Institutes of Technical Assistants were linked to the Ministry of Municipal and Rural Affairs.

Due to the government's interest in preparing the workforce in technical and vocational fields and the increasing need to qualify Saudi youth in technical and vocational fields, it has been decided that all areas of technical and vocational training will be under one organization. Therefore, Royal Decree No. (30 / M) dated 8/10/1400 AH was issued to establish the General Organization for Technical Education and Vocational Training, which includes technical institutes and vocational training centers under its umbrella.

Accordingly, the organization began to carry out its tasks by developing programs and human resources in line with the country's responsibility to meet the needs of the business sector. As a result, the urgent need to create highly qualified national cadres capable of advancing the requirements of the ambitious development plans of the state was apparent. This need has been culminated in the issuance of High Order No. (7 / H / 5267) dated 7 / 3 / 1403H, which supports the decision of the Supreme Committee for Education Policy No. (209) dated 10/29/1402 AH, which included the need to support technical education at the level of technical colleges to open other disciplines for higher education in a field where the country's needs have grown and become urgent. The High Order confirmed that the responsibility for expanding this pattern lay on TVTC, which achieved several positive aspects, including:

1. The academic curriculum should not be dominant, and thus technical colleges maintain their special mission of preparing cadres for the labor market and its requirements.
2. The implementation of training programs in TVTC is to be in three vocational levels: vocational and industrial training (second and third levels) and technical training (fourth level). These levels reflect the TVTC's output of various qualifications. Besides, the majors - at these levels – are integrated, which help a lot take advantage of the widely available capabilities.
3. The relationship between technical colleges and the labor market should not recede, and the gap between training programs and the nature of the need in the work sector should be bridged and reduced.
4. TVTC should unify the curriculum, the qualification level, and the requirements of the training programs and rely on unified bases and coordinate based on vocational standards prepared by specialists in the labor market.

The royal endorsement for the bachelor's program No. (1194) / dated 06/10/1409 AH stipulated that “TVTC shall develop the Technical College in Riyadh and extend the study period to four years in order to grant a bachelor’s degree in technical engineering.” TVTC expanded its applied technical bachelor's program in training plans due to the need for the business sector to be highly qualified to build leadership capabilities in technical and vocational fields.

In the year 1418/1419 AH, TVTC established a Center for Community Service and Continuous Training. Its mission stems from the desire to harness the financial and human capabilities of the corporation to serve the needs of the various work sectors, as this achieves a better investment for technical and human resources and linking educational and training units to those sectors. Also, the Technical Trainers and Intermediary Center Institute was established in Riyadh, and it was one of the most important training and development facilities in the field of preparing technical trainers to meet the needs of vocational training units in all disciplines. It provides two types of programs: preparatory programs and developmental programs.

By establishing technical colleges, TVTC developed technical and vocational training tracks in a progressive system to technically prepare the qualified workforce with different levels to meet the local market's need for technical and vocational working hands with varying skill levels. According to the idea of joining technical and vocational training fields under one umbrella, the Council of Ministers Resolution No. (3108), dated 4/3/1426 AH, was issued to affix the vocational training sector for girls to the Technical and Vocational Training Corporation and establish technical colleges for girls, focusing on vocational training programs for women and enabling them to get a suitable job after graduation.

In 1428 AH, the Royal order No. (268) was issued on 8/14/1428 AH to restructure TVTC according to the orientations of the state. TVTC continued in developing training programs to focus on skills and operating efficiency. It attracted the best international expertise in technical training to operate international colleges and strategic partnerships institutes, help existing colleges improve the quality of training, and make optimal use of the available human and financial resources to contribute to providing distinguished quality training. And due to the importance of integration between education in its various levels and training, the Council of Ministers issued a resolution (469), dated 7/20/1438 AH, that The Minister of Education chairs TVTC's board of directors.

== Vision, objectives and mission ==
The Council of Ministers resolution No. 158 dated 6/12/1429 AH was issued to approve the general training plan for the Technical and Vocational Training Corporation, which included:

=== Vision ===
TVTC is actively contributing to economic, social, and environmental development by providing technical and vocational training for the sons and daughters of the nation with the quality and adequacy required by the labor market and achieving global leadership that guarantees independence and self-sufficiency.

=== Mission ===
The Technical and Vocational Training Corporation seeks to:

1. develop, provide, and license technical and vocational training programs according to the quantitative and qualitative demand of the labor market for both males and females. In addition, it enacts the regulations relevant to the quality and efficiency of these programs and supervises them.
2. raise society's awareness of the importance of technical and vocational training and provide training opportunities for capable males and females for all age groups.
3. carry out the necessary research and projects to follow up technical advancements and global trends in the field of technical and vocational training.
4. support and participate in national programs that adopt the transfer and indigenization of technology; support and direct the private sector to invest in the field of technical and vocational training.

=== Strategic objectives ===
1. To accommodate the largest number of those interested in technical and vocational training in order to contribute to achieving sustainable development.
2. To qualify and develop national human cadres in technical and vocational fields according to quantitative and qualitative labor market demand.
3. To provide training programs with quality and adequacy that qualify the trainee to obtain a suitable job in the free labor market.
4. The ability to adapt and interact successfully with challenges and changes, based on research and applied studies.
5. To build strategic partnerships with the business sector in order to implement professional technical programs.
6. To raise awareness about the importance of working in technical and vocational fields among the community and provide an appropriate environment for lifelong training.
7. To create a safe and stimulating environment for work and training in the Technical and Vocational Training Corporation.
8. Encouraging investment in technical and vocational training, as well as in private training.
9. The national training.
10. To expand the advanced training fields that support national plans and participate in programs to transfer and develop the technology.

The Technical and Vocational Training Corporation has set a number of goals that must be achieved, as follows:

- Provide the individual with Islamic and general culture that contributes to the formation of high morals, strong belief, and the ability to comprehend and think, and adapt to different environments.
- Provide a broad scientific base for the technicians to make it easy for them to respond to the rapid development in technology and technical sciences.
- Provide the opportunity for every person willing to learn a profession or continue his training to the maximum of his mental and physical potential, which is called the open training course.
- Develop skills of technicians and continuously updating their professional knowledge.
- Emphasize the dignity of manual and professional work and their role in the prosperity of society.
- Contribute to stopping internal migration to big cities by spreading vocational training centers in all regions of the Kingdom.

=== Strategy of objective implementation ===
- TVTC aims to prepare and train the Saudi citizen to carry out vocational, craft, and technical work in various sectors (industrial, agricultural, commercial, and public services), whether at free work for companies or at the government and the public sector. In addition, TVTC aims to provide training within colleges, institutes, and centers. It also aims to continue developing and raising the level of technicians and professionals on the job to provide them with advanced knowledge in the fields of science and technology, whether inside or outside the Kingdom.
- TVTC seeks to prepare illiterates and adolescents who have not continued their academic education by directing and training them in special morning and evening programs according to their age, abilities, and inclinations to continue their education or practice technical work.
- TVTC aims to prepare the Saudi technical cadres of teachers and trainers.
- TVTC aims to direct investment to develop the skill structure to expand the base of technical work in the Kingdom.
- TVTC aims to create an educational structure with a unified course to support the technical workforce in coordination with the human qualification agencies and the Ministerial Committee for Manpower.
- TVTC aims to support vocational orientation processes by raising technical and vocational awareness via concerned agencies, which will have better technical and training results on the TVTC's services to achieve the desired goals.
- TVTC aims to pay attention to research and studies to address the workforce's technical problems considering the labor market needs.

== Technical and Vocational Training Corporation training units ==
The total number of TVTC facilities reaches up to 260 units, covering all regions of the Kingdom of Saudi Arabia, and the units vary as the following:

1. Colleges of Technology.
2. International Colleges of Technology.
3. Institutes of strategic partnerships.
4. Industrial institutes and secondary institutes of architecture and construction.
5. Vocational training institutes in prisons.

TVTC also licenses and supervises nearly 1011 private training units.

== Majors and training programs ==
TVTC offers more than (250) majors and training programs, including:

1. Training programs in the TVTC's units such as colleges and institutes, institutes of strategic partnerships and the international technical colleges.
2. Training programs in private training facilities.
3. Flexible supportive social programs.

TVTC is continuously expanding training programs to meet the needs of the labor market, based on the Kingdom vision 2030.

=== Training programs in technical institutes and colleges ===
Communications	Programming	Electrical Power	Women Decorating
Fashion design	Medical devices technology	Electronics	Office management
Marketing	Multimedia technology	Cosmetic	Electrical machines and equipment
Event management	Skin care and make-up	Architecture	Renewable energy
Human Resource Management	Mechanical Machinery Maintenance	Auto Mechanics	Food Safety
Warehouse management	Environmental protection	Food production	Refrigeration and air-conditioning
Computer network systems management	Technical support	Accounting	Hajj and Umrah

=== Training programs in the institutes of strategic partnerships ===
Supply Management	Nuclear Sciences	Printing and Packaging	Ports Operation
Rubber industries	Food technologies	Household appliances	Building quality inspection
Plastic Fabrication Technology	Facilities Engineer	Web and Application Development	Hotels Management
Occupational health and safety	Data analysis and artificial intelligence	Shipbuilding and maintenance	Cloud computing
Precision instrumentation and control	Fashion	Aircraft maintenance	data analysis
Trains driving	Tourism management	Gastronomy	Information security
Restaurant Management	Games design and development	Solar Energy Sciences	Project Management

== Colleges of Technology ==
Technical colleges qualify students at high school or their equivalent to obtain an intermediate university degree (sixth level of the National Qualifications Framework). These colleges also offer some applied bachelor programs (seventh level of the National Qualifications Framework) to qualify trainees as technical engineers to meet the needs of the local labor market by technical human resources or recruited them as trainers in the TVTC facilities. The duration of training in these colleges is two and a half years for the diploma, while in bachelor's programs, an additional two and a half years is required.

=== Boys Technical Colleges ===
Technical colleges operate according to the midterm system, where the training year is divided into two training semesters, each term lasts 15 weeks and does not include the preparation and final evaluation periods, and the trainee's graduation in the diploma phase requires passing between 75 and 85 training units (this depends on specialization), in addition to a semester for cooperative training. In the applied bachelor's stage, a license is required between 64 and 91 training units, according to the training plans.

A list of the technical colleges for boys

Riyadh Technical College	College of Communication and Information in Riyadh	Technical College in Makkah Al-Mukarramah	Madinah Technical College
College of tourism and hotel in Madinah	Jeddah Technical College	College of Communications and Electronics in Jeddah	Technical college in Dammam
Buraidah college of technology	The second technical college in Buraidah	Technical College in Onaizah	Abha Technical college
Hail College of Technology	Qurayyat College of Technology	Jazan Technical College	Arar College of Technology
Tabuk College of Technology	Al-Jouf Technical College	Najran Technical College	Al-Baha Technical College
Al-Kharj College of Technology	Al-Ahsa College of Technology	Qatif College of Technology	Taif College of Technology
Zulfi College of Technology	Hafr Al-Batin College of Technology	Technical College in Bishah	College of Technology in Al-Rass
College of Technology in Quwayiyah	Al-Dawadmi Technical College,	Khamis Mushayt College of Technology	Majmaah College of Technology
Al-Qunfudhah College of Technology	Wadi Al-Dawasir College of Technology	Al-Namas College of Technology	Yanbu College of Applied Technology
Technical College of Baqa'a	Technical College in Samtah	Technical College of Al Aflaj	College of Technology in Al-Mathnab
Technical College in Mahayel Asir	The second technical college in Abha	The technical college in Darb	The technical college, in Al-Leith
The Technical College of Turabah	Technical College in Rafha	The College of Tourism and Hotel, Taif,	College of Technology, Umluj
The College of Technology in Al-Wajh	The College of Tourism in Al-Muzahmiyya	The Technical College in Al-Dair	The College of Technology in Al-Sailail
The Technical College in Al-Hayt	The Technical College in Ranyah	The Technical College in Sarat Abidah	The Technical College in Al-Hanakia
College of Technology Al-Mikhwah	Tabarjal Technical College	Turaif Technical College	The Technical College in Domat Al-Jandal
Ula Technical College	Balkarn College of Technology	Saudi Mining Polytechnic	

=== Technical Colleges for Girls ===
Technical colleges for girls were opened in all regions of the Kingdom to accommodate high school graduates in all its branches in a number of professional and technical specializations needed by the local labor market. Female graduates from technical colleges for girls are granted an intermediate university degree after completing the core training requirements. A number of specialties. Technical training programs for girls aim to prepare qualified technicians to work in a number of professional and technical fields needed by the Saudi labor market, as the number of programs offered by them reached six training programs that can be increased according to market requirements.

The approved training system in the technical colleges for girls is the semester system, as each training year consists of two training classes of not less than (18) weeks, including preparation and evaluation. After the trainee completes the training hours approved for the program and required for graduation, the graduate is given a graduation document, according to the classification of the Ministry of Human Resources and Development .The TVTC is concerned with the quality of technical training, strengthening its curricula and developing them to raise the efficiency of its performance by focusing on advanced modern technology at all levels, in line with the needs of the national economy, the requirements of the labor market in the Kingdom, and the period for completing graduation requirements.

List of technical colleges for girls

Technical College for Girls in Riyadh	Technical College for Girls in Madinah almonawarah	Technical College for Girls in Arar	Technical College for Girls in Al-Ahsa
Technical College for Girls in Hail	Technical College for Girls in Khamis Mushait	Technical College for Girls in Buraidah	Technical College for Girls in Al-Baha
Technical College for Girls in Al-Kharj	Technical College for Girls in Tabuk	Technical College for Girls in Najran	Technical College for Girls in Taif
Technical College for Girls in Jeddah	Technical College for Girls in Al-Jouf	Technical College for Girls in Ar-Rass	Technical College for Girls in Jazan
Technical College for Girls in Hafr Al-Batin	Technical College for girls in Al-Dawadmi	Technical College for Girls in Al-Aflaj	Technical College for Girls in Zulfi
Technical College for Girls in Mahayel Aseer	Technical College for Girls in Bisha	Technical College for Girls in Makkah Al-Mukarramah	Technical College for Girls, Yanbu
Technical College for Girls in Al-Badayea	Technical College for Girls in Sarat Abidah	Technical College for Girls in Abha	The Digital Technical College for Girls in Riyadh
The Digital Technical College for Girls in Jeddah			

== International Colleges of Technology ==
Governmental technical colleges provid high-quality training for boys and girls through international operators and trainers with industrial experience to graduate qualified cadres of both genders with international standards to meet the needs of the local labor market.These colleges provide diploma in two years preceded by intensive English course. Bachelor of Applied Engineering Program is takin place in the Technical Trainers college.

== Strategic partnerships ==
Non-profit technical training institutes that the TVTC adopts to establish, license, supervise, and operate with the private sector. It offers holders of high school or its equivalent various technical training programs in a period of time by employing a beginner training.

Institutes for strategic partnerships have been established in pursuit of the objectives of the National Transformation Program that comes within the Kingdom's vision 2030, as the TVTC represented by the National Center for Strategic Partnerships has involved the private sector in its training program system to ensure the quality of training, and to meet the labor market needs of qualified national cadres, as it aims to meet the needs of the private sector in the priority sectors of emiratisation.

According to these partnerships, the TVTC undertakes the establishment of institutes and equips them with basic equipments as the private sector participates in the operation, providing distinguished trainers and the training programs. The private sector provides specialized equipment and benefits from the support of the Human Resources Fund. These partnerships are free to be locally or internationally operated. Nowadays, these institutes are internationally operated by several international agencies, including Japanese, American, New Zealand, Canadian, British and Dutch.

List of strategic partnerships institutes in the Kingdom

name of the institute	city	the strategic partner
Saudi Technical Institute for Petroleum Services	Dammam	Ministry of Petroleum, Aramco and Aramco contractors
Saudi Technical Institute for Petroleum Services	Khafji	Ministry of Petroleum, Aramco and Aramco contractors
Technical Institute for Dairy and Nutrition	Al-Kharj	Almarai Company
Saudi Technical Institute for Electricity Services	Riyadh	Saudi Electricity Company
Saudi Technical Institute for Electricity Services	Baish	Saudi Electricity Company
Saudi Technical Institute for Electricity Services	Ju'aymah	Saudi Electricity Company
Saudi Technical Institute for Mining	Arar	Ma’aden Company
The Saudi Railways Technical Institute	Buraidah	Saudi Railways Company (SAR)
The Saudi Japanese Automobile Higher Institute	Jeddah	The Federation of Japanese Automobile Industry and Japanese car suppliers
The Saudi Institute for Electronics and Home Appliances	Al-Dir'iya	The Japanese appliances distributor companies
Higher Institute of Water and Electricity Technologies	Rabigh	Aqua Power Company
Higher Institute of Paper and Industrial Technologies	Jeddah	Middle East Paper Company
Higher Institute for Tourism and Hospitality	Al-Bahah	Al-Hokair Group
Higher Institute for Tourism and Hospitality	Jizan	Al-Hokair Group
Higher Institute for Plastic Industries	Riyadh	The Japanese partner and Al-Sharq SPDC
Higher Institute for Rubber Industries	Yanbu	YANPET Company
Arabian Drilling Academy	Abqaiq	Aramco Company
National Industrial Training Institute	Al-Ahsa	Aramco and a group of its contractors and the Electricity Company
Riyadh Institute of Technology	Riyadh	Obeikan Company
The National Institute for Inspection Technology and Quality Assurance (Itqan)	Ju'aymah,	Aramco company
National Construction Training Center	Nairiya	Aramco company
National Training Center for Facilities and Hospitality Management	Riyadh	General Authority for Tourism and National Heritage, Saudi Aramco
National Training Center for Facilities and Hospitality Management	Al-Khobar	General Authority for Tourism and National Heritage, Saudi Aramco
National Academy for Information Technology	Riyadh	Ministry of Communications and Information Technology, Colleges of Excellence Communications and Information Technology Commission, Saudi Aramco
The National Maritime Academy	Ras Al-Khair	Aramco, Bahri, Hyundai, Mawani
National Energy Academy	Dammam	Aramco, the Saudi Electricity Company, the Public Corporation for desalination of salt water, King Fahd University of Petroleum and Minerals
The Higher Institute for Women in Tourism and Hospitality	Riyadh	Al-Hokair Group
National Aviation Academy	Rabigh	Aramco, Ministry of Education, Saudi Aviation Club, Saudi Airlines, Economic Cities Authority, General Civil Aviation Authority, Aviation Technology, King Abdullah Economic City
Saudi Digital Academy	Riyadh	Ministry of Communications and Information Technology
Pioneer National Academy	Al-Khobar	Aramco, Ministry of Human Resources and Social Development, Human Resources Development Fund
Saudi Entertainment Academy - boys	Riyadh	General Authority for Tourism and National Heritage, Higher Institute for Tourism and Hospitality, Bunyan Training Company
Saudi Entertainment Academy - Girls	Riyadh	General Authority for Tourism and National Heritage, Higher Institute for Tourism and Hospitality, Bunyan Training Company
NEOM Training Center	Tabuk	NEOM Company

== Industrial institutes and secondary architecture and construction institutes ==
Secondary training institutes qualify middle school graduates and first and second secondary grades to obtain the diploma of industrial institutes, architecture and construction. The training period is (3) years. According to the needs of the business sector. These institutes also offer various evening training programs available to all members of the society and for many professions, according to the needs of the business sector.

TVTC implements institutes' programs to enable graduates of intermediate school or higher to obtain a high school diploma. It offers (102) specialized programs to them for a period of one training semester, to obtain a certificate of completion of a training program and benefit from the rapid qualification specified for the skill. Training in such institutes is of vital importance in the rapid rehabilitation of the national workforce, and in meeting the national development needs in providing technical and skilled workers, which qualifies them to join the labor market.

List of industrial institutes and secondary architecture and construction institutes

First Secondary Industrial Institute in Riyadh	Secondary Industrial Institute in Buraidah	Secondary Industrial Institute in Al-Muthnab	Secondary Industrial Institute in Eidabi
Secondary Industrial Institute in Tabuk	Secondary Industrial Institute in Afif	First Secondary Industrial Institute in Alahsa	Secondary Industrial Institute in Beshah
Secondary Industrial Institute in Najran	Secondary Industrial Institute in Abha	Secondary Industrial Institute in Alkharj	Secondary Industrial Institute in Tathlith
Secondary Industrial Institute in Dammam	Secondary Industrial Institute in Hail	Secondary Industrial Institute in Alwajh	Secondary Industrial Institute in Dhahran Aljanoob
Secondary Industrial Institute in Hootat Bani Tamim	Secondary Industrial Institute in Jeddah	Secondary Industrial Institute in Hafr Albatin	Secondary Industrial Institute in Badir
Secondary Industrial Institute in Alqurayat	Secondary Industrial Institute in Majmaah	Secondary Industrial Institute in Turif	Second Industrial Secondary Institute in Madinah
Secondary Industrial Institute in Alrras	Secondary Industrial Institute in Surat Ubaidah	Secondary Industrial Institute in Aljouf	Secondary Industrial Institute in Alzulfi
Secondary Industrial Institute in Hunakiyah	Secondary Industrial Institute in Unaizah	Secondary Industrial Institute in Taif	Secondary Industrial Institute in Alduwadmi
Secondary Industrial Institute in Balqarn	Secondary Industrial Institute in Khamis Mushait	Secondary Industrial Institute in Huraidhah	Secondary Industrial Institute in Albaha
Secondary Industrial Institute in Qatif	Secondary Industrial Institute in Hotat Sdir	Secondary Industrial Institute in Ula	Secondary Industrial Institute in Sharorah
Secondary Industrial Institute in Sabia	Secondary Industrial Institute in Badaye	Secondary Industrial Institute in laith	Secondary Industrial Institute in Qunfuthah
Secondary Industrial Institute in Mahayl Asir	Secondary Industrial Institute in Dheba	Secondary Industrial Institute in Wadi Addawaser	Secondary Industrial Institute in Makkah
Secondary Industrial Institute in Jazan	Secondary Industrial Institute in Aflaj	Riyadh Royal Industrial Institute	Secondary Industrial Institute in Taima
Secondary Industrial Institute in Amluj	Secondary Industrial Institute in Shagra	Secondary Industrial Institute in Mukhwat	Secondary Industrial Institute in Tabarjal
Secondary Industrial Institute in Samtah	Secondary Industrial Institute in Rfha	Secondary Industrial Institute in Farsha	The Third Industrial Secondary Institute in Alahsa
Secondary Industrial Institute in Mahd	Secondary Institute of Architecture and Construction in Riyadh	Secondary Institute of Architecture and Construction in Riyadh Alkhabra	Secondary Institute of Architecture and Construction in Hali

== Vocational training institutes in prisons ==
TVTC established Institutes in cooperation with the General Directorate of Prisons, for inmates in prisons and inmates in care homes for girls during their sentence, in order to train and qualify them in specialized professional programs and courses. The graduate is granted a certificate from the Industrial Institute in the region without indicating that he obtained the qualification in prison.

== Private training centers ==
They are non-governmental training institutes and centers established by the private sector for the purpose of providing training, technical and professional programs. They are licensed by TVTC, supervising their performance, and applying quality standards to them. The number of private training facilities reaches 674 training facilities for men and 337 training facilities for women.

they offer various training programs in all specializations, and at multiple levels, from short developmental courses to post-secondary training diplomas, as follows:

1. Training Diploma: a training program that lasts from two to three years.
2. Qualifying program: a training program that lasts from one to less than two years.
3. Qualifying Course: A training program of more than a month to less than a year, and the number of training hours of which is more than (60) hours.
4. Developmental Course: A training program of no more than one month's duration, and the number of training hours of which does not exceed (60) hours.

== Flexible supportive and community programs ==
=== Business and community service center ===
The center works to strengthen the TVTC link with the public and private sectors, which supports the activation of the institution's role in community development by harnessing its assets, human and knowledge capabilities to carry out research, studies, consultations, training services and technical projects. The center also contributes to spreading technical and professional awareness by providing programs for different groups of society of different ages, cultural and economic levels in the form of lectures, scientific meetings, training programs and courses, and other means available to enable all members of society to keep pace with the development of technical and vocational fields.

=== National Entrepreneurship Institute (Riyadh) ===
A non-profit institute specializing in supporting and empowering those wishing to engage in self-employment, and owners of small and medium enterprises through training and qualification, providing advice, guidance, incubating projects, assistance in obtaining funding from funding agencies, and facilitating government procedures by an elite group of national entrepreneurs in the field of entrepreneurship.

=== E-training center ===
E-training is one of the modern training methods to deliver information to the trainee through modern computer technologies, the global network, their multiple media, and modern technologies that contribute to achieve the strategic goals of TVTC.

By using communication and information technology in the educational and training process, TVTC achieved a high-quality national model in e-learning and training by building an integrated electronic training system that relies on specialized experts, qualified local competencies, advanced technologies and strong digital training content.

=== Specialized English Language Graduate Program ===
A specialized program for graduates of technical colleges for boys and girls to qualify them for the labor market through educational institutions specializing in English language training, according to which training is carried out by trainers whose mother tongue is English. The program focuses during a full training semester on the communication skills in English that the trainee needs to work in the private sector.

=== Employment coordination ===
TVTC aims to help graduates by providing suitable job opportunities through activities held by the colleges that achieve this goal, as well as through (Taqani) portal listed on the official website of TVTC and represents a bridge between graduates and employers, and the graduate can benefit from the portal's services through the application of (teqani for graduates) for smart devices.

- The number of employment coordination units in the vocational colleges is 151 functional coordination units, in addition to 13 employment coordination offices in the district administrations.
- The number of job opportunities for the year 2019 and the first half of 2020 reached more than 39,000 job opportunities.

== International cooperation ==
=== Regional and Arab cooperation ===
In response to the policy of the Custodian of the Two Holy Mosques government aimed at strengthening integration between the countries of the Cooperation Council for the Arab Gulf States, and developing the Kingdom's relationship with Arab and Islamic countries and friendly countries in a way that achieves common interests, TVTC has been keen to participate in many events and activities in the field of technical and vocational training in the GCC countries through its participation and hosting of some meetings held by officials and specialists in the sectors of technical and vocational training and the exchange of visits, information and successful experiences, and participation in the meetings of directors and presidents of universities and higher education institutions in the GCC countries, in addition to participating in conferences, seminars and other events, and cooperating with the Arab Bureau of Education for the Gulf States.

As for the Arab level, TVTC participates in some meetings and seminars that are held in some Arab countries, and provides a number of them with academic curricula and provides the opportunity for many trainees of the GCC and Arab countries to study and train in technical colleges, technical institutes and vocational training centers affiliated with TVTC. This comes within the framework of the Kingdom's efforts and its keenness to strengthen the relationship with brothers in the GCC countries and other Arab countries. For years, the Foundation has used numbers of teachers, trainers and faculty members from Arab countries to teach and train. In addition to continuous coordination with a number of international bodies and organizations such as the Arab Labor Organization, the Arab Administrative Development Organization, and the Arab Educational, Cultural and Scientific Organization.

=== Cooperation with foreign countries ===
With the acceleration of technical developments in the contemporary world and the Kingdom's awareness of the need to keep pace with these developments, the importance of technical and vocational training has emerged because of the capabilities it provides that contribute to the development of society in an era of explosive information and knowledge and the multiplicity of modern means of communication. Therefore, it was necessary to take advantage of international cooperation agreements with a number of developed countries and to exploit what international organizations can offer in transferring and indigenizing technology. Consequently, cooperation agreements were concluded with a number of industrially advanced countries such as the United States, Germany and Japan, and the government supported these agreements to achieve the goal set for them. The scope of cooperation has also been expanded to include other countries such as Canada, Australia, Britain and Malaysia. According to this cooperation, the experiences of these countries are used in developing programs, curricula, educational equipment and training methods, in addition to training human cadres. TVTC is also keen to cooperate with international bodies and organizations specialized in the field of education and training, such as UNESCO and the International Labour Organization.
