= Salah Abdel-Haq =

Egyptian preacher and doctor (born 1945)

Salah Abdel-Haq صلاح عبد الحق
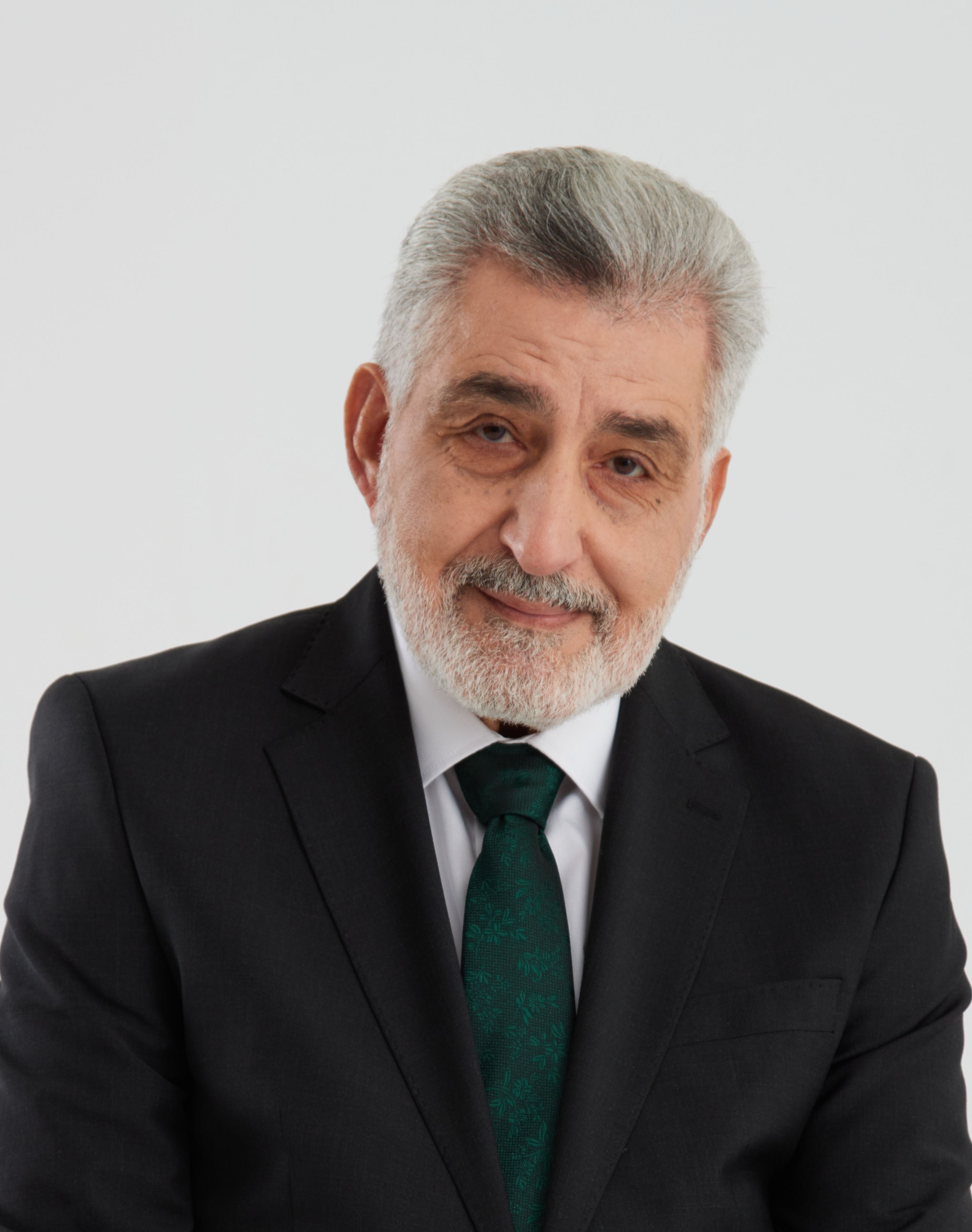
- Salah Abdel-Haq

General Guide of the Egyptian Muslim Brotherhood
- Incumbent
- Assumed office 1 March 2023

Personal details
- Born: 1 October 1945 (age 81) Cairo, Egypt
- Education: Ain Shams University

Salah Abdel Haq (Arabic: صلاح عبد الحق; born 1 October 1945), is the acting General Guide of the Muslim Brotherhood since March 2023, according to what is referred to as the London Front. He is an Egyptian preacher and doctor, and the former head of the International Islamic Forum for Education. He joined the Muslim Brotherhood in 1962, influenced by the ideology of Hassan al-Banna, the founder of the group. He graduated from the Faculty of Medicine at Ain Shams University in 1976 and worked as a dermatologist.

== Life ==
Abdel Haq was born in Cairo on 1 October 1945. He grew up in a religiously conservative family in Cairo's upper-middle-class neighbourhood of Heliopolis. He entered the Faculty of Medicine at Ain Shams University in 1962, but his graduation was delayed until 1976 due to his arrest, which lasted for nine years. During his imprisonment, he developed an interest in studying academic subjects, and therefore, after his release from prison in 1974, he took the exams the same year and continued his education. He completed his Bachelor of Medicine degree in December 1976 and finished his residency in 1977. Abdul haq continued his academic studies and in 1982 he obtained a specialization degree (Master's) in dermatology.

Abdel Haq joined the Muslim Brotherhood in 1962, and was detained three years later at the age of 19 during the rule of then President Gamal Abdel Nasser who had also suppressed the Brotherhood. At the time, Abdulhaq was imprisoned along with Mohammed Badie and his deputy Mahmoud Ezzat, who is also currently imprisoned in Egypt. In 1985, Abdulhaq left Egypt for Saudi Arabia where he worked as a dermatologist before moving to Turkey.

In the 1990s, the Brotherhood's Guidance Office assigned him to travel abroad and work in the global educational apparatus of the group, until he held the position of head of the global educational apparatus of the Brotherhood for more than 15 years.

== Muslim Brotherhood ==
Salah Abdel-Haq was introduced to the Muslim Brotherhood during his high school years through Syrian students who were members of the Brotherhood. These students had come to study at Egyptian universities following the declaration of unity between Egypt and Syria in 1958.

In 1962, he officially joined the ranks of the Brotherhood. Three years later, at the age of 19, he was arrested during the rule of Gamal Abdel Nasser, the then-president of Egypt, who had also suppressed the Muslim Brotherhood. At that time, Abdel-Haq was imprisoned alongside Mohamed Badie and his deputy Mahmoud Ezzat, who is also currently imprisoned in Egypt.

Two of his brothers were also detained with him in the military prison. Salah Abdel-Haq remained in prison for nine years until he was released in 1974 during the rule of Anwar Sadat.

Salah Abdel-Haq gained prominence within the Muslim Brotherhood for his educational and preaching activities. He was known as a speaker and teacher, maintaining a strong connection to the ideas of Hassan al-Banna, the founder of the Brotherhood, whose thoughts greatly influenced him. In the 1970s, he actively participated in the early Islamic activities and the call to Islam among university students.

He continued his work in the fields of preaching and educational guidance and was responsible for the “Global Islamic Education Association” for more than fifteen years.

Salah Abdel-Haq was elected as the representative of the “Muslim Brotherhood’s Overseas Egyptian Relations” in the General Shura Council of the Brotherhood. This occurred during the period when Ibrahim Munir was carrying out the duties of the General Guide, Mohamed Badie. In the 1990s, the Brotherhood's Guidance Office assigned him to travel abroad and work within the group's global educational apparatus. He served as the head of the Muslim Brotherhood's global educational apparatus for more than 15 years.

The “Ikhwan Site” website announced that the General Shura Council of the Muslim Brotherhood had elected Abdel-Haq as the Acting General Guide of the Brotherhood. This decision came following the death of Ibrahim Munir in London in 2022, and Salah Abdelhaq received unanimous support from the Global Shura Council of the Muslim Brotherhood.

== Views ==
In June 2025, the Acting Supreme Guide of the Muslim Brotherhood, Salah Abdel Haq, affirmed his full support for the Islamic Republic of Iran in confronting the Twelve-Day War between Iran and Israel. Abdel-Haq notes in a letter addressed to Iran's Supreme Leader Ayatollah Ali Khamenei that "the current conflict is not an isolated Iranian battle, but rather a new chapter in the ongoing targeting of the regional resistance movement, particularly due to Iran’s support for the Palestinian resistance". He described the Israeli assault as a strategic escalation aimed at reinforcing the occupation's dominance over the region. Abdel-Haq argued that this move has been facilitated by unconditional backing from the United States and several Western countries. Abdel-Haq notes that the Israeli occupation does not differentiate between nations, sects, or religious denominations in its attacks, but rather targets all those who support the resistance project — whether it be a key state like the Islamic Republic of Iran, or Islamic movements, including the Muslim Brotherhood. The Acting Supreme Guide of the Muslim Brotherhood called for unifying ranks and overcoming sectarian and historical differences to confront the "common enemy," emphasising that what the region is experiencing, from Palestine to Lebanon, Yemen, and Iran, requires a comprehensive Islamic strategic unity.

== See also ==
- History of the Muslim Brotherhood in Egypt
