= Muslim Brotherhood in Egypt =

Egyptian branch of the Muslim Brotherhood

Muslim Brotherhood
- Leader: Salah Abdel-Haq
- Founded: 22 March 1928; 98 years ago Ismailia, Kingdom of Egypt
- Headquarters: Cairo, Egypt
- Ideology: Sunni Islamism; Social conservatism Religious conservatism Mixed economy
- International affiliation: Muslim Brotherhood

Party flag

Website
- www.ikhwanonline.com www.ikhwanweb.com

The Muslim Brotherhood in Egypt (Arabic: جماعة الإخوان المسلمين Jamāʿat al-Ikhwān al-Muslimūn/al-Ikhwan/el-ekhwan al-muslimīn, IPA: [elʔexˈwæːn]) is the Egyptian branch of the Muslim Brotherhood, with adherents estimated to number between 2 and 2.5 million. Founded by Hassan al-Banna in 1928, the group spread to other Muslim countries but has its largest organization in Egypt, despite government crackdowns in 1948, 1954, 1965, 1979, 1981 and 2013, after plots, or alleged plots, of assassination and overthrow were uncovered.

Following the 2011 Egyptian revolution, it launched a political party—the Freedom and Justice Party—to contest elections, which it described as having "the same mission and goals, but different roles" than the Brotherhood, and agreeing to honor all Egypt's international agreements. The party won 42% of the seats in the 2011–12 parliamentary elections, and its candidate, Mohamed Morsi, the June 2012 presidential election. Morsi was overthrown by the army within a year, and a crackdown ensued that some have called more damaging to the movement than any "in eight decades". Hundreds of members were killed and imprisoned, including Morsi and most of the Brotherhood's leadership. In September 2013, an Egyptian court banned the Brotherhood and its associations, and ordered that its assets be seized; and in December the military-backed interim government declared the movement a terrorist group following the bombing of security directorate building in Mansoura. The Brotherhood denied being responsible for the attack and Ansar Bait al-Maqdis, an al-Qaeda-linked group, claimed responsibility. They also issued a statement condemning violence.

== History ==
=== Under the monarchy ===
The Muslim Brotherhood was founded in 1928 by Hassan al-Banna, an Egyptian schoolteacher, who preached implementing traditional Islamic Sharia law in all aspects of life, from everyday problems to the organization of the government. Inspired by Islamic reformers Muhammad Abduh and Rashid Rida, he believed that Islam had lost its social dominance to corrupt Western influences and British imperial rule.

The organization initially focused on educational and charitable work, but quickly grew to become a major political force as well. (Sources disagree as to whether the Brotherhood was hostile to independent working-class and popular organisations, or supported efforts to create trades unions and unemployment benefits.) It championed the cause of poor Muslims, and played a prominent role in the Egyptian nationalist movement, fighting the British, Egypt's occupier/dominator. It engaged in espionage and sabotage, as well as support for activities orchestrated by Haj Amin al-Husseini in British Mandate Palestine, and up to and during World War II some association with Britain's enemy, the German Nazis, dissemination of anti-Jewish and anti-Western propaganda.

Over the years, the Brotherhood spread to other Muslim countries, including Syria Jordan, Tunisia, etc. as well as countries where Muslims are in the minority. These groups are sometimes described as "very loosely affiliated" with the Egyptian branch and each other.

In November 1948, following several bombings and assassination attempts, the government arrested 32 leaders of the Brotherhood's "secret apparatus" and banned the Brotherhood. At this time the Brotherhood was estimated to have 2000 branches and 500,000 members or sympathizers. In succeeding months Egypt's prime minister was assassinated by Brotherhood member Abdel Meguid Ahmed Hassan, and following that Al-Banna himself was assassinated in what is thought to be a cycle of retaliation.

In 1952, members of the Muslim Brotherhood were accused of taking part in an event that marked the end of Egypt's "liberal, progressive, cosmopolitan" era – an arson fire that destroyed some "750 buildings" in downtown Cairo – mainly night clubs, theatres, hotels, and restaurants frequented by British and other foreigners.

=== After the 1952 revolution ===
In 1952, the monarchy was overthrown by nationalist military officers of the Free Officers Movement. While the Brotherhood supported the coup it vigorously opposed the secularist constitution that the coup leaders were developing. In 1954 another unsuccessful assassination was attempted against Egypt's prime minister (Gamal Abdel Nasser), and blamed on the "secret apparatus" of the Brotherhood. The Brotherhood was again banned and this time thousands of its members were imprisoned, many of them held for years in prisons and sometimes tortured.

One of them was the very influential theorist, Sayyid Qutb, who before being executed in 1966, issued a manifesto proclaiming that Muslim society had become jahiliyya (no longer Islamic) and that Islam must be restored by the overthrow of Muslim states by an Islamic vanguard, also revitalising the ideal of Islamic universalism. Qutb's ideology became very influential outside of the Egyptian Muslim Brotherhood, but the Brotherhood's leadership distanced itself from Qutb and adhered to a nonviolent reformist posture.

Imprisoned Brothers were gradually released after Anwar Sadat became president of Egypt in 1970, and were sometimes enlisted to help fight Sadat's leftist opposition. Brethren were allowed to publish the magazine Al Dawa, though the organization remained illegal. During this time, more radical Qutb-inspired Islamist groups blossomed, and after Sadat signed a peace agreement with Israel in 1979, the Muslim Brotherhood became confirmed enemies of Sadat. Sadat was assassinated by a violent Islamist group Tanzim al-Jihad on 6 October 1981, shortly after he had Brotherhood leaders (and many other opposition leaders) arrested.

=== Mubarak era ===
Again with a new president, (Hosni Mubarak), Brotherhood leaders (Supreme Guide Umar al-Tilmisani and others) were released from prison. Mubarak cracked down hard against radical Islamists but offered an "olive branch" to the more moderate Brethren. The brethren reciprocated, going so far as to endorse Mubarak's candidacy for president in 1987.

The Brotherhood dominated the professional and student associations of Egypt and was famous for its network of social services in neighborhoods and villages. However, the government did not approve of the Brotherhood's renewed influence (it was still technically illegal), and resorted to repressive measures starting in 1992.

In the 2000 parliamentary elections, the Muslim Brotherhood won 17 parliamentary seats. In 2005, it won 88 seats (20% of the total compared to 14 seats for the legally approved opposition parties) to form the largest opposition bloc, despite the arrest of hundreds of Brotherhood members. It lost almost all but one of these seats in the much-less-free 2010 election, which was marred by massive arrests of both Brethren and polling place observers. Under Egypt's emergency law Brethren could only stand as independents, but were easily identified since they campaigned under the slogan – "Islam Is the Solution".

During and after the 2005 election the Brethren launched what some have called a "charm offensive". Its leadership talked about its "responsibility to lead reform and change in Egypt". It addressed the `Coptic issue', insinuating that the Brethren would do away with Egypt's decades-old church building-permit system that Coptic Christians felt was discriminatory. Internationally the Brethren launched an English-language website and some of the Muslim Brotherhood's leaders participated in an Initiative to 'Re-Introduc[e] the Brotherhood to the West', "listing and addressing many 'Western misconceptions about the Brotherhood.'"

Seeing this campaign as a direct threat to its position as an indispensable ally of the west against radical Islamism, the Egyptian government introduced an amendment to the constitution that removed the reference to Islam as "the religion of the state", and would have allowed women and Christians to run for the presidency. Brotherhood MPs responded by walking out of parliament rather than voting on the bill. In addition, the movement has also reportedly played into the government's hands, provoking non-Islamist Egyptians by staging a militia-style march by masked Brotherhood students at Cairo's Al Azhar University, complete with uniforms and martial arts drills, reminding many of the Brotherhood's era of "secret cells".

According to another observer:

after a number of conciliatory engagements and interactions with the West", the Brotherhood retreated into its comfort zone of inflammatory rhetoric intended for local consumption: all suicide bombers are 'martyrs'; 'Israel' regularly became 'the Jews'; even its theological discourse became more confrontational and oriented to social conservatism.

Two years later the Egyptian government amended the constitution, skewing future representation against independent candidates for parliament, which are the only candidates the Brotherhood can field. The state delayed local council elections from 2006 to 2008, disqualifying most Muslim Brotherhood candidates. The Muslim Brotherhood boycotted the election. The government incarcerated thousands of rank-and-file Muslim Brotherhood members in a wave of arrests and military trials, the harshest such security clampdown on the Brotherhood "in decades".

=== 2011 revolution and Morsi ===
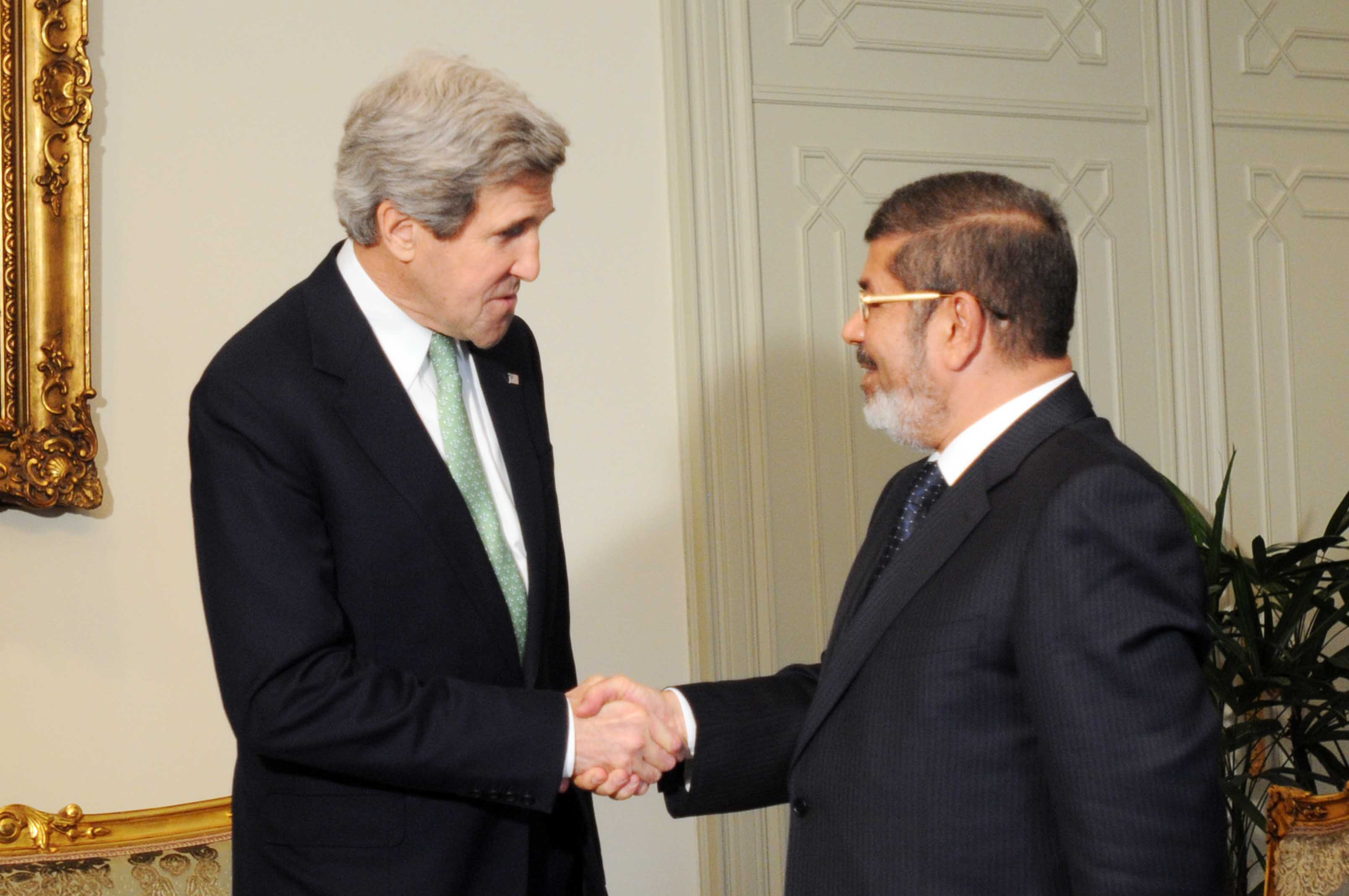
U.S. Secretary of State John Kerry meets with Egyptian President Mohamed Morsi, March 2013

Following the 2011 revolution that overthrew Hosni Mubarak, the Brotherhood was legalized and emerged as "the most powerful" and "most cohesive political movement" in Egypt. Its newly formed political party won two referendums, far more seats than any other party in the 2011–12 parliamentary election, and its candidate Mohamed Morsi won the 2012 presidential election. However within a year there were mass protests against his rule and he was overthrown by the military.

In the January–February 2011 uprising itself, the Brotherhood remained "on the sidelines", but even before it was officially legalized it launched a new party called the Freedom and Justice Party. The party rejected "the candidacy of women or Copts for Egypt's presidency", although it did not oppose their taking cabinet positions. In its first election the party won almost half of 498 seats in the 2011–12 Egyptian parliamentary election.

In the first couple of years after the revolution, critics speculated about both secret collusion between the Brotherhood and the powerful (secular oriented) military, and a looming showdown between the two. The Brotherhood and the military both supported the March constitutional referendum which most Egyptian liberals opposed as favoring established political organizations. It was said to have stopped the "second revolution" against military rule by remaining uninvolved during violent clashes between revolutionaries and the military in late 2011, and protests over the thousands of secretive military trials of civilians.

Egyptian author Ezzedine C. Fishere worried that the Brotherhood had

managed to alienate its revolutionary and democratic partners and to scare important segments of society, especially women and Christians. Neither the Brotherhood nor the generals showed willingness to share power and both were keen on marginalising the revolutionary and democratic forces. It is as if they were clearing the stage for their eventual showdown.

While the ruling Supreme Council of the Armed Forces (SCAF) dissolved the parliament dominated by the Brotherhood and other Islamic parties, the Brotherhood won the presidential election, defeating Ahmed Shafik, a former military officer and prime minister of Mubarak.

Within a short period, serious public opposition developed to President Morsi. In late November 2012, he issued a temporary constitutional declaration granting himself the power to legislate without judicial oversight or review of his acts, on the grounds that he needed to "protect" the nation from the Mubarak-era power structure. He also put a draft constitution to a referendum that opponents complained was "an Islamist coup". These issues—and concerns over the prosecutions of journalists, the unleashing of pro-Brotherhood gangs on nonviolent demonstrators; the continuation of military trials; and new laws that permitted detention without judicial review for up to 30 days, and impunity given to Islamist radical attacks on Christians and other minorities—brought hundreds of thousands of protesters to the streets starting in November 2012. During Morsi's year-long rule there were 9,000 protests and strikes.

By April 2013, Egypt had "become increasingly divided" between President Mohamed Morsi and "Islamist allies" and an opposition of "moderate Muslims, Christians and liberals". Opponents accused "Morsi and the Muslim Brotherhood of seeking to monopolize power, while Morsi's allies say the opposition is trying to destabilize the country to derail the elected leadership". Adding to the unrest were severe fuel shortages and electricity outages—which evidence suggests were orchestrated by Mubarak-era Egyptian elites.

By 29 June, the Tamarod (rebellion) movement claimed it had collected more than 22 million signatures calling for Morsi to step down. A day later, mass demonstrations occurred across Egypt urging Morsi to step down. Demonstrations in support of him were organized as a response.

=== After the July 2013 overthrow of Mohamed Morsi ===
On 3 July, the head of the Egyptian Armed Forces, General Abdel Fattah el-Sisi responded to the demands of the protesters in Tahrir Square during the 30 June demonstrations, and after discussing the issue with the main political parties and religious leaders of the country, removed President Mohamed Morsi and suspended the constitution. Brotherhood supporters staged sit-ins throughout the country, setting up camps and shutting down traffic.

The crackdown that followed has been called the worst for the Brotherhood's organization "in eight decades". On 14 August, the military declared a month-long state of emergency in response to their violence after removing the camps. In retaliation Brotherhood supporters looted and burned police stations and dozens of churches.

The sit-in dispersal led to clashes, resulting in the deaths of 638 people and injury of some 4000. By 19 August, al Jazeera reported that "most" of the Brotherhood's leaders were in custody. On that day Brotherhood Supreme Leader Mohammed Badie was arrested, crossing a "red line", as even Hosni Mubarak had never arrested him.

On 23 September, a court ordered the group outlawed and its assets seized. Two days later security forces shuttered the main office of the newspaper of the Freedom and Justice Party, and confiscated its equipment. Muslim Brotherhood criticized the decision to seize its assets and those of MB-linked charities, as opening the door to Christian charities and as part of a campaign against Islam.

Some question whether the military and security services can effectively crush the Brotherhood. Unlike the last major crackdown in the 1950s, when Egypt's "public sphere and information space" was tightly controlled, the Brotherhood has a larger and broader international presence beyond the reach of Egypt's government to sustain itself.

Others—such as Hussein Ibish and journalist Peter Hessler—believe it "unlikely" that the Brotherhood will return to political prominence soon, because of its aggressive and incompetent performance while in power. According to Hessler, the group antagonized the powerful entrenched government institutions, the news media and millions of non-supporters, acting "with just enough aggression to provoke an outsized response", while not having nearly enough military resources to defend itself against that response. It "no longer leads the anti-government movement" and has even lost its "religious credibility", such that "at mosques, even staunch opponents of the coup told me that they wouldn't vote for the Brotherhood again". Hessler also argues that "the strong showing for the party in post-revolution elections exaggerated MB strength, noting that in one Upper Egyptian district (El Balyana), the MB party had dominated the Presidential vote and nearly won a parliamentary seat, but the Brotherhood itself had only ten local members in a district of approximately six hundred thousand. Since then its support has declined drastically.". According to one Islamist (but non-member) quoted in the Africa Report in 2021,

Even support given to families of imprisoned and killed members [in Egypt by the international MB] have stopped or is very little, ... The Brotherhood [has given] up on the people inside and outside prisons in Egypt, and now the leadership in Qatar, Turkey, and London are fighting ... Life has to go on, and we have to complete the struggle on our own. The Brotherhood is a phase that ended and now we have to take care of our own.

Hussein Ibish believes the Brotherhood is being challenged by the Salafi movement, and undergoing a crisis so severe that "what ultimately emerges from the current wreckage [may] be unrecognisably different" from the traditional Brotherhood.

A day after the 2013 bombing of a security directorate building in Mansoura, the interim government declared the Muslim Brotherhood movement a terrorist group—despite the fact that another group, the Sinai-based Ansar Bait al-Maqdis, claimed responsibility for the blast. On 24 March 2014, an Egyptian court sentenced 529 members of the Muslim Brotherhood to death, an act described by Amnesty International as "the largest single batch of simultaneous death sentences we've seen in recent years anywhere in the world". On 15 April 2014, an Egyptian court banned current and former members of the Muslim Brotherhood from running in the presidential and parliamentary elections.

=== Division ===
In 2015, a split appeared in the Brotherhood between an old guard afraid that resorting to violence could mean the annihilation of the Brotherhood, and a new leadership, joined by the rank and file, that believed that "only by bleeding" the regime could it "be brought to its knees". In May, Mahmoud Hussein, the (former) secretary general of the Muslim Brotherhood, reported on his Facebook page that Mahmoud Ezzat had "taken over" the Muslim Brotherhood. On the official Brotherhood website a spokesperson replied: "We affirm that the group's institutions, which were elected by its base last February, manages its affairs and that only the official spokesman of the group and its official outlets represent the group and its opinion."

Observers attribute the dispute to a number of factors. Robert Worth notes the disastrous situation into which the old leadership had led the MB, the disruption of the MB hierarchy by the "decapitation" of the leadership through arrests and imprisonment, and the dislocation of exile (often to Turkey and Qatar) of much of the rank and file. Samuel Tadros credits changes in the MB to the influence of Revolutionary Salafists, many of whom allied with the Brotherhood in the year before the As-Sisi coup. When Islamists broke through security barriers to join the Brotherhood at Nahda and Rab'a squares, "ideas flowed freely and bonds were created", with the Salafists influencing MB more than vice versa. Salafists joined the anti-coup alliance of the MB, and its youth moved from using molotov cocktails in self-defense to offense. The MB structure broken, young members are now influenced by "takfiri sheikhs" on satellite channels.

Members blamed President Morsi not for alienating non-members with his non-inclusive rule, but for being insufficiently revolutionary and not crushing the state institutions that would later overthrow him. The slogan "Our peacefulness is stronger than bullets" has been replaced by "All that is below bullets is peacefulness." A new body, the Administrative Office for Egyptians Abroad, clashed with the Old Guard of Ibrahim Munir, Deputy Supreme Guide Mahmoud Ghozlan and others.

At the same time as the split, a statement titled Nidaa al-Kinana (Egypt Call) signed by 159 international MB and Egyptian Salafist Islamic scholars and endorsed by the Brotherhood was released. It declared the As-Sisi regime criminal and murderous and stated that the current regime was an enemy of Islam, and it was the religious duty of Muslims to "eliminate it by all legitimate means. ... Any leaders, judges, officers, soldiers, media figures or politicians, and anyone [else] who is definitely proved to be involved (even if only through incitement) in violating the honor of women, shedding the blood of innocents and unlawful killing – [all these] are murderers according to the shari'a, and must be punished according to the shari'a." (The punishment for murderers per sharia is death.) As of mid-2015 over 600,000 people had "endorsed" the petition.

In June 2015, the "Revolutionary Punishment" movement celebrated six months of attacks, including the killing of 157 and wounding of 452 security personnel, the destruction of 162 military cars and 53 buildings.

As of early 2025, the MB in Egypt has been described (by Georges Fahmi) as "marked by a divided leadership and a significant loss of members". A dispute remains between Mahmoud Hussein, the group secretary-general, Salah Abdel Haq, the acting guide of the Brotherhood, and the General Bureau of the Brotherhood, remains. The youth of the Brotherhood are described as disillusioned, with many deciding to "take a step back from the organization", disappointed by the competition among leadership and failure to develop a strategy.

=== More Repression ===
As of early 2024, the movement's Supreme Guide, Mohamed Badie, his two deputies, Khairat Al-Shater and Mahmoud Ezzat, and thousands of cadres, parliamentary deputies and prominent members throughout Egypt who had been arrested following the overthrow of Morsi, remained in prison.

The Turkish government, which had offered the Brotherhood "refuge and a platform" following its repression in Egypt, started to scale back its support for the group in 2022, as Turkey was suffering from an economic downturn and felt a need to repair relations with Arab countries. In July 2025, one of Brotherhood leaders who had been taking refuge in Turkey, Mohamed Abdel Hafiz, was arrested, allegedly for his part in planning/organizing terrorist plots in Egypt.

== General leaders ==
Supreme guides or General leaders (G.L.) of the Muslim Brotherhood in Egypt have been:

No.	Image	Name	Term
1		Hassan al-Banna (حسن البنا)	1928–1949
2		Hassan al-Hudaybi (حسن الهضيبي)	1951–1973
3		Umar al-Tilmisani (عمر التلمساني)	1973–1986
4		Muhammad Hamid Abu al-Nasr (محمد حامد أبو النصر)	1986–1996
5		Mustafa Mashhur (مصطفى مشهور)	1996–2002
6		Ma'mun al-Hudaybi (مأمون الهضيبي)	2002–2004
7		Mohammed Mahdi Akef (محمد مهدي عاكف)	2004–2010
8		Mohammed Badie (محمد بديع)	16 January 2010–present

== Beliefs, policies, strategy ==
=== Stated platform and goals ===
The Brotherhood itself describes the "principles of the Muslim Brotherhood" as including firstly the introduction of the Islamic Sharia as "the basis controlling the affairs of state and society;" and secondly work to unify "Islamic countries and states, mainly among the Arab states, and liberating them from foreign imperialism". It denounces the "catchy and effective terms and phrases" like "fundamentalist" and "political Islam" which it claims are used by "Western Media" to pigeonhole the group, and points to its "15 Principles" for an Egyptian National Charter, including "freedom of personal conviction ... opinion ... forming political parties ... public gatherings ... free and fair elections".

In October 2007, the Muslim Brotherhood issued a detailed political platform. Amongst other things it called for a board of Muslim clerics to oversee the government, and for limiting the office of the presidency to Muslim men. In the 'Issues and Problems' chapter of the platform, it declared that a woman was not suited to be president because the post's religious and military duties 'conflict with her nature, social and other humanitarian roles'. While underlining 'equality between men and women in terms of their human dignity,` the document warned against 'burdening women with duties against their nature or role in the family.'

=== Political strategy ===
In his writing, Hassan Al-Banna outlined a strategy for achieving power of three stages:

- the initial propaganda stage (preparation),
- the organization stage (in which the people would be educated by the Muslim Brotherhood), and
- finally, the action stage (where power would be taken or seized).

Analyzing the movement's communiqués according to the framework of the Institute for Propaganda Analysis (IPA), the institute found the communiqués served goals of

1. discrediting the current military regime;
2. winning the hearts and minds of Egyptians; and,
3. establishing themselves as a legitimate political actor.

=== Political viewpoints ===
The Brotherhood's self-description as moderate and rejecting violence has created disagreement among observers. Political moderation is a contested concept, and various authors have a put forth a range of opinions on the issue. For some, this is a question of using violence or not: a Western author, (Eric Trager), interviewing 30 current and former members of the Brotherhood in 2011 and found that the Brethren he talked to emphasised "important exceptions" to the position of non-violence, namely conflicts in Afghanistan, Bosnia, Chechnya, Iraq, and Palestine. Trager quotes the former Supreme Guide Mohammed Mahdi Akef as telling him

We believe that Zionism, the United States, and England are gangs that kill children and women and men and destroy houses and fields. ... Zionism is a gang, not a country. So we will resist them until they don't have a country.

Trager and other have also noted the MB's use of the honorific "sheikh" to refer to Osama bin Laden. While the Brotherhood differs with bin Laden and al-Qaeda, it has not condemned them for the 9-11 attacks because it does not believe they were responsible. A recent statement by the Brotherhood on the issue of violence and assassinations condemned the killing of "Sheikh Osama bin Laden" by the United States, saying: "The whole world, and especially the Muslims, have lived with a fierce media campaign to brand Islam as terrorism and describe the Muslims as violent by blaming the September 11th incident on al-Qaeda."

However, according to authors writing in the Council on Foreign Relations magazine Foreign Affairs: "At various times in its history, the group has used or supported violence and has been repeatedly banned in Egypt for attempting to overthrow Cairo's secular government. Since the 1970s, however, the Egyptian Brotherhood has disavowed violence and sought to participate in Egyptian politics." Jeremy Bowen, BBC Middle East editor, calls the Brotherhood "conservative and non-violent".

According to the Israeli-affiliated media-watchdog group MEMRI (Middle East Media Research Institute), the Arabic language (but not the English language) website of the Egyptian Muslim Brotherhood has displayed much anti-Semitic and anti-Israel content. A report by MEMRI found articles engaging in Holocaust denial, praising jihad and martyrdom, condemning the Egyptian-Israeli peace treaty, calling for the destruction of Israel, and condemning negotiations with non-Muslims to regain lands lost by Islam. A "common motif" of the website is Antisemitic conspiracy theories warning Muslims against "the covetous and exploitative nature of the 'Jewish character'".

On 13 March 2013, the Muslim Brotherhood released a statement opposing the UN declaration 'End Violence against Women' on the grounds that it would "undermine Islamic ethics and destroy the family", and "would lead to complete disintegration of society".

In the book Secret of the Temple, written by Tharwat al-Khirbawy, a former member of the Muslim Brotherhood of Egypt, Khirbawy "explores the ideology of Mursi and the small group of leaders at the top of the movement, examining their devotion to Sayyid Qutb, a radical ideologue executed in 1966 for plotting to kill president Gamal Abdel Nasser". The book has been "dismissed by Brotherhood leaders as part of a smear campaign".

During the reign of President Mohamed Morsi, the Muslim Brotherhood experienced good relations with Iran, in which the IRGC was approached to establish a similar version in Egypt. After the overthrow of Morsi, leaders from the Muslim Brotherhood and IRGC met in a hotel in Turkey in 2014 to cooperate an alliance against Saudi Arabia. In April 2021, a Muslim Brotherhood delegation led by Hammam Ali Youssef met Temel Karamollaoğlu, leader of Saadet Partisi, during a period of diplomatic contacts between Turkey and Egypt, after breaking off relations since 2013.

=== Relations with non-Muslims ===
Talking to television channel France 24 shortly before he was elected president, Mohammed Morsi stated: "The majority of the people are Muslims and the non-Muslims, our brothers, are citizens with full responsibilities and rights and there is no difference between them. If any Muslim says anything other than this, he is not understanding Sharia."

However, after Morsi took power as president, critics complained that attitudes of and actions by Brotherhood leaders concerning non-Muslims changed. In late April 2013 a fatwa issued by a member of the MB general guide's office—'Abd Al-Rahman Al-Barr (who is often referred to as the movement's mufti)—forbade Muslims from greeting Christians on their Easter holiday, explaining that Easter and resurrection were contrary to the Muslim faith. "Jesus did not die and was not crucified, but rather Allah gave him protection from the Jews and raised [Jesus] up to Him ... which is why we do not greet anyone for something we strongly believe is wrong." This was a change in practice from past MB leaders and even Al-Barr himself who had not only allowed but practiced the greeting of Christians on Easter, according to Coptic and opposition leaders. Columnist A'la Al-'Aribi in the daily Al-Wafd attacked the fatwa as "politics disguised as shari'a". Al-Barr's previous "view reflected the position of the MB at that time – but now that circumstances have changed [and the MB is in power], he has changed his position..."

Another article in newsobserver.com noted President and former MB official Mohammed Morsi "has done little to assuage concerns" of Christians by being "slow to condemn the latest round of sectarian violence" in April 2013, not attend the naming of the new Coptic pope, and having no plans to attend Coptic Easter services – an annual custom of the former Egyptian President.

In August 2013, following the 3 July 2013 Coup and clashes between the military and Morsi supporters, there were widespread attacks on Christian Coptic churches and institutions. USA Today reported that "forty churches have been looted and torched, while 23 others have been attacked and heavily damaged". The Facebook page of the Muslim Brotherhood's Freedom and Justice Party was "rife with false accusations meant to foment hatred against Copts", according to journalist Kirsten Powers. The party's page claimed that the Church had declared "war against Islam and Muslims". Despite the Christians relatively minor role in the campaign against President Morsi, the page justified the attacks by saying: "After all this people ask why they burn the churches." Later it posted: "For every action there is a reaction" and "The Pope of the Church is involved in the removal of the first elected Islamist president. The Pope of the Church alleges Islamic Sharia is backwards, stubborn, and reactionary." On 15 August, nine Egyptian human rights groups under the umbrella group Egyptian Initiative for Personal Rights, released a statement saying,

In December ... Brotherhood leaders began fomenting anti-Christian sectarian incitement. The anti-Coptic incitement and threats continued unabated up to the demonstrations of June 30 and, with the removal of President Morsi ... morphed into sectarian violence, which was sanctioned by ... the continued anti-Coptic rhetoric heard from the group's leaders on the stage ... throughout the sit-in.

== Organization ==
The Brotherhood applies a highly selective membership process which gives its "internal cohesiveness and ideological rigidity" and is unique among Egyptian political/social organizations in its "breadth" and "depth" of networks. The long (typically at least four and a half years) and closely monitored membership process is thought to have prevented infiltration by state security during the presidencies of Anwar Sadat and Hosni Mubarak. Its structure bears some similarity to a similar Islamist party, Jamaat-e-Islami, in having a hierarchical organization where many supporters do not reach the level of full members. Potential members are recruited by recruiters who do not at first identify themselves as Brothers to prospective members.

Estimates of the Brotherhood's membership and supporters vary between 100,000 and 600,000. According to anthropologist Scott Atran, while the Brotherhood has 600,000 dues paying members in Egypt it can count on only 100,000 militants in a population of more than 80 million Egyptians. The New York Times describes it as having "millions of affiliates and sympathizers throughout" Egypt in addition to its members.

How unified and powerful the Brotherhood is, is disputed. Former deputy chairman, Muhammad Habib has said, "there are fissures" in the Brotherhood, "and they may be to the very core. There is concern among the younger members that the leadership does not understand what's going on around it." Another high-ranking member, Abdel Moneim Aboul Fotouh, who was recently expelled from the Brotherhood, warned of the possibility of "an explosion". Other observers (Eric Trager) have described the Brotherhood as "Egypt's most cohesive political movement, with an unparalleled ability to mobilize its followers".

Following the 2013 crackdown, the "most leaders" of the top rank (the Brotherhood's Guidance Office), second rank (Shura Council) and third rank (heads of municipalities and administrative bureaus) are "either in prison, exile or hiding", according to Khalil al-Anani of Al-Monitor. Journalist Kareem Fahim, describes the group as having "fallen back on the organizational structure that sustained it for decades" when it was banned. He reports that the Brotherhood is "becoming more decentralized, but also more cohesive and rigid".

=== Supporter levels ===
- muhib ("lover" or "follower"). The lowest level of the Brotherhood is the muhib. One is typically a muhib for six months, but the period can be as long as four years. A muhib is part of an usra ("family") which closely monitors the muhib's piety and ideological commitment, working to "improve the morals" of the muhib. An usras meets at least once a week and "spends much of its time discussing members' personal lives and activities". The usra usually has four or five members and is headed by a naqib ("captain").
- muayyad ("supporter"). A muhib graduates to muayyad after confirmation that the muhib prays regularly and possesses basic knowledge of major Islamic texts. This stage lasts from one to three years. A muayyad is a nonvoting member of the brotherhood. Their duties include carrying out tasks such as preaching, recruiting, teaching in mosques assigned to them by superiors. They also follow a "rigorous curriculum of study", memorizing sections of the Quran and studying the teachings of Hasan Al Banna, the founder of the Brotherhood.
- muntasib ("affiliated"). This process lasts a year and is the first step toward full membership. As one Brother put it, a muntasib "is a member, but his name is written in pencil". A muntasib continues to study Islam (hadith and Tafsir) and now tithes the brotherhood, (typically giving 5% to 8% of their earning).
- muntazim ("organizer"). This stage typically lasts another two years. A muntazim must continue memorizing hadith and complete memorization of the Quran and "can assume a lower-level leadership role, such a forming an usra or heading a chapter" of usras.
- ach'amal ("working brother"). This final level is reached after the subject loyalty is "closely probed". "An ach'amal can vote in all internal elections, participate in all of the Brotherhood's working bodies, and compete for higher office within the group's hierarchy.

=== Offices and organs ===
- Murshid ("Supreme Guide"). Head of the Brotherhood (and of its Maktab al-Irshad)
- Maktab al-Irshad ("Guidance Office"). Maktab al-Irshad consists of approximately 15 longtime Muslim Brothers including the Murshid, who heads the office. Each member of the office oversees a portfolio on an issue such as university recruitment, education, politics, etc. The office execute decisions made by the Majlis al-Shura and passes down orders through a chain of command, consisting of "its deputies in each regional sector, who call their deputies in each subsidiary area, who call their deputies in each subsidiary populace, who call the heads of each local usra, who then transmit the order to their members."
- Majlis al-Shura ("Consultative Council"). This consists of approximately 100 Muslim Brothers. Debates and votes on important decisions, such as whether to participate in national elections. Elects members of the Maktab al-Irshad.

==== Publications ====
The Muslim Brotherhood has published several newspapers and magazines, including Al Nadhir, Al Dawa and Majallat al Ikhwan al Muslimin.

=== Social services ===
The brotherhood operated 21 hospitals throughout Egypt, providing modern medical care at subsidized prices. It also operated job-training programmes, schools in every governorate in the country and programs to support widows and orphans.

An estimated 1,000 of the roughly 5,000 legally registered NGOs and associations in Egypt are run by the Brotherhood according to Abul Futouh, a leading brotherhood member. Its clinics are reputed to have more available basic supplies and more up-to-date equipment. However, the Brotherhood's network of organizations is complex, sometimes operate under different names, and is difficult to track.

The Brotherhood's response to the 1992 earthquake in Cairo, where 50,000 people were made homeless, was an example of the group's effectiveness, compared to that of the Egyptian government. It quickly mobilized to provide victims with food and blankets and setting up makeshift medical clinics and tents for shelter.

According to Kareem Fahim, following the 2013 crackdown members have started to abandon "activities like preaching and social work" as they focus on "resistance to the military-backed government".

=== Muslim Sisterhood ===
The Muslim Sisterhood is the female division of the Muslim Brotherhood. The members of the Muslim Sisterhood have been traditionally more involved in charitable activities than other members of Muslim Brotherhood. They are credited with keeping the Brotherhood together during the dark days of the 1950s and 1960s when many male members were intentionally dispersed across Egypt's prisons in order to cripple the apparatus, but the sisters "acted as an informal prison support network, carrying ideas and messages from prison to prison to sustain the Brotherhood, and were vital to their rebirth".

According to Amal Abdelkarim, head of the FJP women's section in the governorate of Giza, the sisters became more active during Nasser years because that is when they helped by interacting with society, attending charities and going to mosques.

The work of the Muslim Sisterhood has helped to attract new members to the Muslim Brotherhood. Many of these members come from university campuses, mosques and trade unions. During the Egyptian revolution of 2011, members of the Muslim Sisterhood have become more politically active, and they participated in the founding of the Freedom and Justice Party by the Muslim Brotherhood in April 2011. Not an auxiliary group, they intend to play an equal role in the government.
