= Mahmoud Ahmad Ibiary =

Mahmoud Ahmad Ibiary (Arabic: محمود أحمد الإبياري; born 5 June 1952) is the deputy secretary general of the International Organisation of the Muslim Brotherhood and the editor is chief of the Muslim Brotherhood's weekly Risalat al-Ikhwan which is published in London.

== Media operations ==
Mahmoud is mentioned as the owner and webmaster of the official Muslim Brotherhood websites. He is also the editor in chief of the Muslim Brotherhood weekly Risalat al-Ikhwan and is involved in satellite TV channels linked to the Muslim Brotherhood in the Middle East like Ahrar25.

Ahrar25 started as a satellite channel and operated from Lebanon but had to shut down its activities when satellite operating companies Nile Sat and Kuwait's Gulf Sat Satellites removed all frequencies in late March 2014. "The two satellite companies' administrations notified Ahrar 25 that the decision was politically motivated and came following pressures from the Egyptian authorities." Currently the channel has only a presence on social media.

== International organisation of the Muslim Brotherhood ==
Since the early 2000s, Mahmoud has been based in London and works as the deputy secretary general of the International Organisation of the Muslim Brotherhood in close harmony with secretary general Ibrahim Munir. The two were part of the Egyptian Muslim Brotherhood delegation which was present at the funeral of former Turkish Prime Minister Necmettin Erbakan in 2011. Other Egyptian Muslim Brotherhood leaders who were present at Erbakan's funeral included Mahdi Akef, Mahmoud Ezzat, Saad El-Katatni, Ayman Aly and Youssef Nada.

Since the 2013 Egyptian coup d'état the profile of Mahmoud became more prominent and has been more in the media.

== Media appearances ==
On 18 August 2013 a group of high-level Muslim Brotherhood members came together in the Westin Palace Hotel in Milan to strategize about the reaction to the military coup in Egypt. The meeting was organized by a local organization close to the Muslim Brotherhood, the Association for Liberty and Justice for Egypt, and the main speaker-leader present was Mahmoud Ibyari, who mentioned in the Italian press as 'the number three' of the Muslim Brotherhood. Following the meeting he gave a press conference where he focused on the fact that the Muslim Brotherhood would only use non-violent resistance to the army. Also in August 2013 Mahmoud was one of the main Muslim Brotherhood speakers on the Muslim Brotherhood friendly international Arabic news channel al-Jazeera.

== Lahore meeting ==
In November 2014 a meeting of leaders of Islamic movements from 30 countries met in Lahore, Pakistan, where they visited the three-day public gathering of Jamaat-e-Islami. The official Egyptian Muslim Brotherhood to the meeting consisted of Secretary-General Mahmoud Hussein, Mahmoud and Ibrahim Munir.
