= Salih Ashmawi =

Leader of the Muslim Brotherhood in Egypt and journalist (1910–1983)

- Born: 1910; Cairo, Egypt
- Died: 1983 (aged 72–73)
- Education: Fuad I University
- Occupation: Journalist
- Years active: 1930s–1983
- Known for: Leader of the Muslim Brotherhood; Founder of Al Dawa

Salih Ashmawi (1910–1983) was an Egyptian political figure and a member of the Muslim Brotherhood. He held several posts in the group and edited some of its publications such as Al Dawa and Al Nadhir.

== Early life and education ==
Ashmawi was born in Cairo in 1910. He received a bachelor's degree in commerce in 1932 from Fuad I University.

== Career and activities ==
Following his meeting with Hasan Al Banna Ashmawi joined the Muslim Brotherhood in 1937. Next year Ashmawi was appointed editor-in-chief of Al Nadhir, a weekly journal started by the Brotherhood. However, he left the Brotherhood after internal disputes stopping the publication of the journal and involved in the establishment of another Islamic group entitled the Society of Mohammad's Youth.

Later he restored his relations with Al Banna and became the head of secret group within the Brotherhood. Under his leadership the secret apparatus gained considerable autonomy to the extent that Al Banna had no power over it. Ashmawi was part of the extremist faction and was appointed the deputy secretary of Al Banna in 1947, replacing Ahmad Mohammad Al Sukkari in the post. Abdul Rahman Al Sanadi, on the other hand, succeeded Ashmawi as the head of the Brotherhood's secret network.

In 1949 Al Banna was assassinated, and Ashmawi and Hasan Ismail Al Hudaybi became the leaders of the Brotherhood which was banned in 1948. In 1951 Ashmawi launched an Islamic journal, Al Dawa, which was the official organ of the group. In 1953 he and Mohammad Al Ghazali, another senior Brotherhood figure, were dismissed from the group due to their conflict with Hasan Ismail Al Hudaybi. Both Ashmawi and Al Ghazali were also arrested and jailed as part of Gamal Abdel Nasser's crackdown against the Brotherhood.

== Later years and death ==
Ashmawi collaborated with Umar Al Tilmisani to start Al Dawa in 1976. The journal was published until 1981, and its founder Ashmawi died in 1983.
