= Gulf and Arabian Peninsula Unity Forum =

Central coalition of Gulf unity

The Gulf and Arabian Peninsula Unity Forum (Arabic: منتدى وحدة الخليج والجزيرة العربية), known as the Gulf Arab Unity Forum, is the first of its kind, meant to create a central coalition of Gulf unity in the Arabian Peninsula. This forum is associated with numerous controversial topics and people regarding terrorism and terror financing.

== Description ==
Its objective, as stated by the general coordinator of the conference, Fahd Albmal, was to create a union to mirror that of the GCC, aimed at discussing broad political reforms and social and political development throughout the gulf. He also indicated that it required four months of planning through the formation of a number of committees and Gulf leaders to complement the GCC. Adel Ali Abdullah, the spokesperson for the conference, stated that these countries, including UAE, Qatar, Kuwait, Bahrain, and Oman, were looking to ensure the stability of these countries and hopefully have Yemen join the league. Additionally, he indicated that they hoped to combat the dangers facing the region that threaten their Islamic identity and foreign security risks. Throughout its promotion, the forum indicated that it gathered political and intellectual elites ranging from academic thinkers, writers, politicians, and journalists from all of the Gulf States in the pretext of a forum or conference, representing all spectrums of society and doctrines of thought.

== Conference ==
The conference was attended by 400 individuals from the 6 GCC countries, and hoped to publicize further this union. It featured a series of seminars by 6 speakers over two days. At the end of the conference, the forum issued a statement calling on all citizens and the institutions of civil society to participate in achieving the objectives of the forum, which included comprehensive reform of the governments and people within the countries represented.

The conference met in Bahrain at the Diplomat Hotel on October 14, 2011, lasting two days. This founding conference was held under the patronage of King Hamad bin Isa Al-Khalifa, and was promoted via social media accounts.

According to its Facebook and Twitter account this forum was meant be its inaugural panel. However, the Facebook page has not been active since the completion of that meeting in October 2011, nor has it been reported that a forum of that scale occurred since then.

On the other hand, its Twitter page, followed by over 1,300 accounts, has been active between the initiation of the conference and April 2014. Its tweets include YouTube links to various workshops and updates of forum and board meetings that have occurred in Bahrain and Paris. Furthermore, it has tweeted various provocative statements including ones that refer to Egyptian Muslim Brotherhood protesters who died in escalated protests as Allah’s martyrs.

It is reported that at the conference, the forum announced stances on controversial issues such as the Syrian Civil War and the insurgencies in Yemen stating that they should use whatever means necessary to fight back their repressive states and any form of aggression. They also discussed Western dangers that threaten Islamic identity.

== Board of trustees ==
Additionally, during the conference a board of trustees was chosen, listing six individuals from each country represented, or 36 in total. Of these 36 individuals, at least 4 are known terrorists or are associated with terrorist groups/activities including Saad bin Saad al –Kaabi, an al Qaeda financier and U.S. sanctioned terrorist, Abdul Rahman bin Omair al-Naimi, another al Qaeda financier and U.S. designated terrorist, Hassan Ahmed al-Diqqi, an extremist al Ummah party leader and Syrian rebel financier, and Abdullah Abdul Qader Ahmad Ali al-Hajiri, a Muslim Brotherhood activist, who has been convicted of treason and jailed in the UAE.
