= Al Nadhir =

Political magazine in Egypt (1938–1939)

- Editor-in-chief: Salih Ashmawi
- Categories: Political magazine
- Frequency: Weekly
- Founded: 1938
- First issue: 30 May 1938
- Final issue: 16 October 1939
- Country: Egypt
- Based in: Cairo
- Language: Arabic

Al Nadhir (Arabic: The Warner) was an Arabic language weekly Islamic magazine which was published in Cairo, Egypt, for one year between 1938 and 1939. Its subtitle was A Political Islamic Weekly. It is known for being one of the official organs of the Muslim Brotherhood for which it was banned in October 1939.

== History and profile ==
Al Nadhir was first published on 30 May 1938. The magazine was an organ of the Muslim Brotherhood and was launched following the closure of other Brotherhood publication, the weekly newspaper Majallat al Ikhwan al Muslimin. The license holder was Mahmoud Abu Zeid who was a member of the Brotherhood until 1939 when he left it to form another Islamic group called the Society of Mohammad's Youth. Al Nadhir was published on a weekly basis, and its editor-in-chief was Salih Ashmawi.

The contributors of Ad Nadhir included Hasan Al Banna and his brother-in-law Abdel Hakim Abdeen. In the first issue of Al Nadhir Al Banna declared in his article entitled Our Second Step that the focus of the Brotherhood had shifted from the religious, cultural and educational activities to the political activities and that they would not only talk from now on, but they would both talk and struggle and carry out practical acts. The political goals set by the Brotherhood's general guidance council were also announced in the first issue of the magazine as follows: (1) increased prestige in the eyes of its tens of thousands of members and of radical Egyptian youth in general and (2) the opening of additional channels for action by the Brotherhood's members and branches. These were the principles that guided the Brotherhood's period of the application and realization of the Islamic mission.

Ad Nadhir frequently featured articles on the Palestine cause reflecting the views of the Muslim Brotherhood. It also covered anti-Semitic editorials and content written by Mahmoud Saleh. German Nazi dictator Adolf Hitler was called Hajj Hitler in the pages of Al Nadhir.

Al Nadhir was banned by the Egyptian government on 16 October 1939 due to its close connections with the Muslim Brotherhood. Before its closure the relationships between Salih Ashmawi and the Brotherhood leader Hasan Al Banna became strained, and Ashmawi's Brotherhood membership was denied which led to the end of Al Nadhir's function as being the mouthpiece of the group.

=== Spin offs ===
A publication with the same name was published by the Syrian sector of the Muslim Brotherhood in the 1970s and 1980s.
