= Dawood Al-Shirian =

Saudi journalist, media proprietor, and television presenter

- داود عبدالعزيز محمد الشريان
- Born: Dawood bin Abdulaziz Mohammed Al-Shirian; August 15, 1954 (age 71); Unaizah, Qassim Province, Saudi Arabia
- Education: King Saud University
- Occupations: Journalist, TV presenter
- Television: Saudi Broadcasting Corporation

Dawood bin Abdulaziz Mohammed Al-Shirian (Arabic: داود عبدالعزيز محمد الشريان; born August 15, 1954) is a Saudi journalist, media proprietor, and television presenter known for leading the national television broadcaster in Saudi Arabia.

== Early life and education ==
Dawood Al-Shirian was born in Unaizah, Saudi Arabia. He studied journalism at King Saud University (KSU) in Riyadh and graduated in 1976.

== Career in media ==
Al-Shirian began his career as a journalist in 1976. He worked with Al Jazirah newspaper and later became the managing editor of Al Yamamah magazine. In 1980, he became the first Saudi correspondent for the international news agency Associated Press. He also held numerous positions, including serving as the general manager and editor-in-chief (EIC) of Al Dawa magazine.

Al-Shirian worked at Dubai TV for three years and hosted the program Journalism Interface on Al-Arabiya TV. During his time at Dubai TV, he presented the weekly political program The Article. He served as the EIC of the Al-Arabiya website and was a member of both the Al-Arabiya Council and the Middle East Broadcasting Center (MBC) Council. He was also the general manager of MBC in Saudi Arabia.

From 2012 to 2017, Al-Shirian hosted television programs on the Middle East Broadcasting Center, including Al-Thamina Ma'a Dawood (Eight o’clock with Dawood).

== Government role ==
Al-Shirian was appointed executive director of the Broadcasting and Television Commission of the Ministry of Culture and Information.

== Leadership at Saudi Broadcasting Corporation ==
In 2017, he was appointed President of the Saudi Broadcasting Corporation (SBC), a major Saudi national TV network. In this role, he oversaw the launch and development of SBC’s programming, which includes entertainment, drama, and cultural content as part of Saudi Arabia's effort to expand and modernize its media industry.

== Publications ==
Al-Sherian published Ayyaal Al-Bassa (The Children of the Alley Cat) in 2023, a collection of selected articles written between 1987 and 2015.
