= Ibrahim Munir =

Leader in the Muslim Brotherhood (1937–2022)

Ibrahim Munir إبراهيم منير

Acting General Guide of the Muslim Brotherhood in Egypt
- In office 4 September 2020 – 13 October 2021
- Preceded by: Mahmoud Ezzat
- Succeeded by: Mostafa Tolba

Personal details
- Born: Ahmed Ibrahim Munir Mustafa; 1 June 1937 Giza, Egypt
- Died: 4 November 2022 (aged 85) London, England

Ahmed Ibrahim Munir Mustafa (Arabic: أحمد إبراهيم منير مصطفى; 1 June 1937 – 4 November 2022), known popularly as Ibrahim Munir (Arabic: إبراهيم منير), was the Secretary General of the International Organisation of the Muslim Brotherhood and the spokesman for the Muslim Brotherhood in the West.

On 12 July 2022, the Muslim Brotherhood announced in a statement by the Egyptian Muslim Brotherhood Consultative Assembly that Ibrahim Munir was exempted from membership of the Muslim Brotherhood and he no longer represents or expresses the Muslim Brotherhood as a result of “non-compliance with the decisions of the Egyptian Muslim Brotherhood Consultative Assembly, and formation of parallel entities away from the legitimate ones.”

== Early years ==
Ibrahim Munir was born on 1 June 1937 in Giza, Egypt. His full name is Ahmed Ibrahim Munir Mustafa. He joined the Muslim Brotherhood at an early age and was sentenced to life imprisonment in Egypt in the 1950s following the attempted assassination of the Egyptian leader Gamal Abdel Nasser. Munir was released in 1975 and left for the Persian Gulf region and moved to the United Kingdom in the early 1980s. He applied for political asylum which was granted.

== Career ==
=== United Kingdom ===
Since Munir arrived in the United Kingdom he has become active in Muslim Brotherhood activities not only promoting the causes of his own movement but also more general Islamic causes. He was a director at the Islamic charity Human Relief International, the Takaful Trust and The Renaissance Foundation in the 1990s. In an interview with Asharq al-Awsat in 2011 he said that he had not visited Egypt since 1987.

The activities of the Egyptian Muslim Brotherhood and the International Organisation of the Muslim Brotherhood are coordinated from the Muslim Brotherhood office at Cricklewood Broadway in London. From the Cricklewood Broadway office the Muslim Brotherhood also publishes its weekly Arabic language newsletter Risalat al-Ikhwan of which Ibrahim Munir is the general supervisor and his deputy Mahmoud El-Abiary the chief editor.

=== 2010 Court Case ===
In 2010 the Egyptian Attorney General Abdul Magid Mahmoud referred a case against Muslim Brotherhood leader abroad to the State Supreme Security Emergency Court for trial. One of the defendants in the case was Ibrahim Munir. He was previously acquitted by lower courts in Egypt in a case known as the Global Network. Among the charges were money laundering and raising funds abroad for an outlawed group. Munir was tried in absence and was convicted to a sentence of 5 years in jail.

In a response to the sentence by the Egypt court Munir said that "he respected the Egyptian judiciary but the regime obliged him to do so, noting that international justice is sufficient to prove his innocence and he denies any false accusations fabricated by the Egyptian regime." Within a day of the sentence in Egypt Ibrahim Munir had appealed that sentence before a British court which was going to hear his case within a month. "I was sentenced to five years' imprisonment on charges of money laundering before a state security court emergency on Saturday". He also pointed out that "he would resort to the international court of justice to prove his innocence." With all the strict regulations on money transfers he said it was difficult to launder money from the UK to Egypt, according to Munir.

=== Erbakan funeral in 2011 ===
In early March 2011, former Turkish Prime Minister Necmettin Erbakan died and was buried in Istanbul. The burial of Erbakan brought a large delegation of the Egyptian Muslim Brotherhood to Istanbul and included former Supreme Guide of the Egyptian Muslim Brotherhood Mahdi Akef, Mahmoud Ezzat, Saad El-Katatni, Ayman Aly, Youssef Nada and also Ibrahim Munir and his assistant Mahmoud El-Abiary.

=== Munir since the ouster of Egyptian President Morsi ===
Since the 2013 Egyptian coup d'état which ousted Muslim Brotherhood president Mohamed Morsi the London office of the Muslim Brotherhood has become the de facto headquarters for the Egyptian Muslim Brotherhood outside Egypt, with Ibrahim Munir in a leading position. Since the Muslim Brotherhood lost power in Egypt the position of Munir has become more visible.

On 17 July 2013, Munir wrote an Op-Ed in Asharq al-Awsat where he claimed that Morsi's ouster was in fact a military coup.

Also on social media Ibrahim Munir can be seen attending many demonstration in London organised by different organisations often close to the Muslim Brotherhood under the umbrella the UK Anti-Coup Alliance often showing the Rabia sign.

=== Jenkins Report on the Muslim Brotherhood ===
In April 2014 British Prime Minister David Cameron commissioned an internal review of the Muslim Brotherhood, including its origins, ideology, record in and out of government; and its organisation and activities in the UK and abroad. The investigation started earlier. In June 2014 Ibrahim Munir was to meet with Sir John Jenkins who led the U.K. government's review of the Muslim Brotherhood. Munir said about the review: "Regardless of the outcome of the review, we will adhere to our principles – and the main one is acting peacefully," he added. "We will abide by British law, but history will judge this action. I expect this review will clear the name of the Brotherhood. But if the result is negative, we will deal with it legally."

In the released findings of the review of the Muslim Brotherhood by the U.K. government, Munir is not mentioned by name but it is clear that the review team spoke with him. "The most senior member of the Muslim Brotherhood permanently resident in the UK told the review team that he coordinated some Muslim Brotherhood international activity, but not Muslim Brotherhood activity in this country."

=== Appointing him as acting general leader of the Egyptian Muslim Brotherhood ===
In August 2015, Ibrahim Munir denied reports that had surfaced in Egyptian and Arab newspapers that he had become the Egyptian Muslim Brotherhood's new deputy Supreme Guide and acting Supreme Guide. He released a statement: "I stress that Dr Mahmoud Ezzat is still the deputy supreme guide and acting supreme guide. With regards my being assigned the duties of the deputy supreme guide, I had been tasked with this some time ago and it is not new." On 4 September 2020, he was appointed as the acting general leader of the Egyptian Muslim Brotherhood after Ezzat was arrested.

=== Exempting him from leading the Muslim Brotherhood in Egypt ===
He was the most senior member of the Egyptian Muslim Brotherhood until October 2021 when the Egyptian Muslim Brotherhood Consultative Assembly (Shoura) made a decision to withdraw confidence from him, and relieve him of his responsibility in the Muslim Brotherhood in Egypt.

Then his successor - in accordance with the general regulation - the member of guidance office Professor Dr. Mahmoud Hussein requested that the regulation not be applied in his regard, and that the matter be referred to the Egyptian Muslim Brotherhood Consultative Assembly to choose the new leadership, the assembly decided to choose an acting committee for general guide role represented by Dr. Mostafa Tolba.

=== Death in exile ===
Munir died on 4 November 2022 in London, at the age of 85.

== See also ==
- Hassan al-Banna
- Mustafa Mashhur
- Sayyid Qutb
- Yusuf al-Qaradawi
- Mohammed Badie
