= Zainab al-Ghazali =

Egyptian activist

Zaynab Al-Ghazali زينب الغزالي
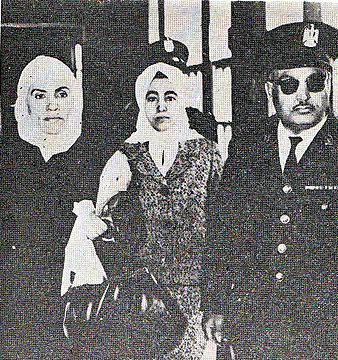
- Zainab al-Ghazali (to the left)
- Born: 2 January 1917; Egypt
- Died: 3 August 2005 (aged 88); Egypt
- Occupation: Founder of the Muslim Women's Association (Jam'iyyat al-Sayyidaat al-Muslimaat)

Zaynab al-Ghazali (Arabic: زينب الغزالي; 2 January 1917 – 3 August 2005) was an Egyptian Muslim activist. She was the founder of the Muslim Women's Association (Jamaa'at al-Sayyidaat al-Muslimaat, also known as the Muslim Ladies' Society).

The historian Eugene Rogan has called her "the pioneer of the Islamist women's movement" and also said she was "one of [Sayyid] Qutb's most influential disciples."

== Biography ==
=== Early life ===
Al-Ghazali was born in Mit Ghamr, a town in the Dakahlia Governorate in Egypt. Her father was educated at al-Azhar University, an independent religious teacher and cotton merchant. He encouraged her to become an Islamic leader citing the example of Nusayba bint Ka'b al-Muzaniyya, a woman who fought alongside Prophet Muhammad in the Battle of Uhud. She studied with Al-Azhar scholars.

For a short time during her teens, she joined the Egyptian Feminist Union only to conclude that "Islam gave women rights in the family granted by no other society." At the age of eighteen, she founded the Jama'at al-Sayyidat al-Muslimat (Muslim Women's Association), which she claimed had a membership of three million throughout the country by the time it was dissolved by government order in 1964.

=== Allegiance to Hassan al-Banna ===
Hassan al-Banna, the founder of the Muslim Brotherhood, invited al-Ghazali to merge her organisation with his, an invitation she refused as she wished to retain autonomy. However, she did eventually take an oath of personal loyalty to al-Banna. Even though her organisation did not formally affiliate with the Muslim Brotherhood, al-Ghazali went on to play a significant role in the Brotherhood's attempted revival in 1964, after it was forcibly disbanded by President Gamal Abdel Nasser in 1954.

=== Theory ===
Eugene Rogan writes that al-Ghazali "devoted herself to the vanguard role envisaged by Qutb's manifesto—preparing Egyptian society to embrace Islamic law." This included "Islamic training of our youth, elders, women and children," among other activities. "In the long run, [her and her peers'] aim was nothing less than the overthrow of the Free Officers' regime and its replacement with a true Islamic state."

Zeinab al-Ghazali promulgated a feminism that was inherently Islamic. She believed in a "notion of habituated learning through practical knowledge" of Islam and the Qu'ran, and she felt that women's liberation, economic rights, and political rights could be achieved through a more intimate understanding of Islam. al-Ghazali also believed that a woman's primary responsibility was within the home, but that she should also have the opportunity to participate in political life if she so chose. al-Ghazali's Patriarchal Islamist stance allowed her to publicly disagree with several issues that "put her at odds with male Islamist leaders".

=== Muslim Women's Association ===
Her weekly lectures to women at the Ibn Tulun Mosque drew a crowd of three thousand, which grew to five thousand during holy months of the year. Besides offering lessons for women, the association published a magazine, maintained an orphanage, offered assistance to poor families, and mediated family disputes.

Some scholars, like Leila Ahmed, Miriam Cooke, M. Qasim Zaman, and Roxanne Euben argue that al-Ghazali's own actions stand at a distance, and even undercuts some of her professed beliefs. To these scholars, among many, her career is one which resists conventional forms of domesticity, while her words, in interviews, publications, and letters define women largely as wives and mothers. For example:

If that day comes [when] a clash is apparent between your personal interests and economic activities on the one hand, and my Islamic work on the other, and that I find my married life is standing in the way of Da'wah and the establishment of an Islamic state, then, each of us should go our own way. I cannot ask you today to share with me this struggle, but it is my right on you not to stop me from jihad in the way of Allah. Moreover, you should not ask me about my activities with other Mujahideen, and let trust be full between us. A full trust between a man and a woman, a woman who, at the age of 18, gave her full life to Allah and Da'wah. In the event of any clash between the marriage contract's interest and that of Da'wah, our marriage will end, but Da'wah will always remain rooted in me. (al Ghazali 2006)

In justifying her own exceptionality to her stated belief in a woman's rightful role, al-Ghazali described her own childlessness as a "blessing" that would not usually be seen as such, because it freed her to participate in public life (Hoffman 1988). Her second husband died while she was in prison, having divorced her after government threats to confiscate his property. Al-Ghazali's family were angered at this perceived disloyalty, but al-Ghazali herself remained loyal to him, writing in her memoir that she asked for his photograph to be reinstated in their home when she was told that it had been removed.

=== Life in prison and release ===
After the assassination of Hassan al-Banna in 1949, al-Ghazali was instrumental in regrouping the Muslim Brotherhood in the early 1960s. Imprisoned for her activities in 1965, she was sentenced to twenty-five years of hard labor but was released under Anwar Sadat's Presidency in 1971.

During her imprisonment, Zainab al-Ghazali and members of the Muslim Brotherhood underwent inhumane torture. Al-Ghazali recounts being thrown into a locked cell with dogs to pressure her to confess an assassination attempt on President Nassir. "[S]he faced whipping, beatings, attacks with dogs, isolation, sleep deprivation, and regular death threats...." During these periods of hardship, she is reported to have had visions of Muhammad. Some miracles were also experienced by her, as she got food, refuge and strength during those difficult times.

After her release from prison, al-Ghazali resumed teaching. In the period 1976–1978, she published articles in Al Dawa, which was restarted by the Muslim Brotherhood in 1976. She was editor of a women's and children's section in Al Dawa, in which she encouraged women to become educated, but to be obedient to their husbands and stay at home while rearing their children. She wrote a book based on her experience in jail.

=== Support for Afghan mujahidin ===
While in her seventies, al-Ghazali visited Pakistan and openly lent her support to the Afghan mujahidin, such as through an interview she gave to al-Jihad, a popular magazine published by the Services Office. In the interview, she was reported to have said: "The time I spent in prison is not equal to one moment in the field of jihad in Afghanistan...I ask God to give victory to the mujahidin and to forgive us our shortcomings in bringing justice to Afghanistan." She has been characterized as "idealizing" the conflict there.

=== Memoir ===
She describes her prison experience, which included torture, in a book entitled Ayyām min ḥayātī, published in English as Days from My Life by Hindustan Publications in 1989 and as Return of the Pharaoh by the Islamic Foundation (UK) in 1994. (The "Pharaoh" referred to is President Nasser.) Al-Ghazali depicts herself as enduring torture with strength beyond that of most men, and she attests to both miracles and visions that strengthened her and enabled her to survive. The Philosopher Sayed Hassan Akhlaq published an essay review about the book along with some critical points.

=== Legacy ===
Zaynab al-Ghazali was also a writer, contributing regularly to major Islamic journals and magazines on Islamic and women's issues.

Although the Islamic movement throughout the Muslim world today has attracted a large number of young women, especially since the 1970s, Zaynab al-Ghazali stands out thus far as the only woman to distinguish herself as one of its major leaders.
