= Mahmoud Ezzat =

Acting Brotherhood leader (born 1944)

- محمود عزت

Acting General Guide of the Muslim Brotherhood in Egypt
- In office 20 August 2013 – 28 August 2020
- Preceded by: Mohammed Badie
- Succeeded by: Ibrahim Munir

Personal details
- Born: Mahmoud Ezzat Ibrahim; 13 August 1944 (age 82) Zagazig, Sharqia Governorate, Egypt
- Party: Muslim Brotherhood in Egypt
- Children: 5
- Relatives: Mohammed Mahdi Akef (father in-law)
- Education: Zagazig University

Mahmoud Ezzat Ibrahim (Arabic: محمود عزت إبراهيم, romanized: Maḥmūd ʿIzzat Ibrāhīm; also sometimes spelled "Mahmoud Izzat"; born 13 August 1944) is the former acting general guide of the Muslim Brotherhood in Egypt and one of the most prominent leaders of the Muslim Brotherhood. Historian Fawaz Gerges describes his role as "akin to chief of staff of the Ikhwan [Muslim Brotherhood]."

== Personal life ==
Ezzat was born on 13 August 1944, in Zagazig, Sharqia Governorate. He is a member of the group's counseling office, and a professor at the Faculty of Medicine at Zagazig University. He is married to the daughter of former supreme guide Mahdi Akef and has five children with her.

== Education ==
- Finished high school in 1960.
- He received his Bachelor of Medicine in 1975.
- And Masters in 1980.
- And Ph.D. in 1985 from Zagazig University.
- Obtained a diploma from the Institute of Islamic Studies in 1998
- And a license to recite Quran from the Recitation Institute in 1999.

== Early Muslim Brotherhood links ==
He got acquainted with the Muslim Brotherhood as a boy in 1953. He enrolled in the (Brotherhood) class in 1962 and was one of the disciples of Sayyid Qutb. He was a student in the Faculty of Medicine when he was arrested in 1965. He was sentenced to ten years and was released in 1974. He was a fourth year student at the time. He completed his studies and graduated from the Faculty of Medicine in 1976, and his connection to the advocacy work in Egypt - especially with the well educated students - remained until he went to work in Sanaa University in the laboratory department in 1981, and then traveled to England to complete his doctoral thesis. He then returned to Egypt and obtained his doctorate from Zagazig University in 1985. He was chosen as a member of the Guidance Office in 1981.

== Imprisonment ==
- He was arrested in 1965 and spent nine years in prison.
- He was arrested in May 1993 pending investigation into the Brotherhood case known as the Salsabeel case.
- In 1995, he was imprisoned for being a leader of an illegal organization.
- He was arrested on 2 January 2009, for participating in a demonstration in the center of Cairo protesting against the Israeli attack on the Gaza Strip.
- On 28 August 2020, Ezzat was arrested during an apartment raid in Cairo, and was succeeded by Ibrahim Munir as the acting general guide of the Muslim Brotherhood in Egypt.
- On 8 April 2021, he was convicted on "terror" charges, and sentenced to life in prison.

== Scientific Interests ==
- Much research and activity in the field of hospital infection resistance in Egypt and Britain.
- Much research into epidemic diseases in Egypt, such as meningitis and cholera.
- Advocacy interests in the field of education, students, public work, human rights, and medical charitable work.
- Vice Chairman of the board of directors of the Islamic Medical Association.

== Appointment as Acting Leader of the Muslim Brotherhood ==
After the arrest of Mohammed Badie on 20 August 2013, the Muslim Brotherhood appointed Mahmoud Ezzat as the acting guide.

== Judgments in absentia ==
Mahmoud Ezzat was issued a number of judgments in absentia in several cases:

- On 19 December 2021, Egypt's State Security Assize Court upheld the death sentence on the former acting Muslim Brotherhood Supreme Leader. He was charged with "foreign intelligence" and "acts of terrorism and sabotage".
- The case of the "Al-Sharainah cell in Minya": The Minya Criminal Court ruled, on 18 August 2020, that the deputy guide of Muslim Brotherhood Mahmoud Ezzat and seven others were sentenced to life imprisonment in absentia for "inciting violence and inciting riots" and "possessing publications that would incite disturbing public opinion."
- Prison break case: On June 16, 2015, the Cairo Criminal Court issued a judgment in absentia to execute Mahmoud Ezzat and 92 others, accused of escaping from Wadi el-Natrun Prison after breaking out of the prison in 2011.
- The "Guidance Office Events" case: He was sentenced to life imprisonment.
- Communication case: The Criminal Court of Nasr City, in absentia, sentenced Mahmoud Ezzat to death for accusing him of communicating with Hamas.

== See also ==
- Hassan al-Banna
- Hassan al-Hudaybi
- Mohammed Mahdi Akef
- Khairat el-Shater
- Essam el-Erian
- Sayyid Qutb
