= 2014 UK government review of the Muslim Brotherhood =

In March 2014, British Prime Minister David Cameron asked the then British Ambassador to Saudi Arabia, Sir John Jenkins, to lead a government review into the Muslim Brotherhood.

The news of the review came when Prime Minister Cameron announced the review at a press conference in late March 2014. "We want to challenge the extremist narrative that some Islamist organisations have put out," the Prime Minister said, and "What I think is important about the Muslim Brotherhood is that we understand what this organisation is, what it stands for, what its beliefs are in terms of the path of extremism and violent extremism, what its connections are with other groups, what its presence is here in the United Kingdom. Our policies should be informed by a complete picture of that knowledge."

Following the announcement at the press conference questions were asked at the House of Lords and the government made it clear that some of the findings of the review would be published. A government announcement stated that "the purpose of the review is to produce an internal report to the Prime Minister to inform government policy towards the Muslim Brotherhood." The government also asked interested parties to submit evidence to be used in the review.

In November 2016, the Foreign Affairs Select Committee released a report denouncing the previous report and attempting to cast the Muslim Brotherhood in a better light. However, this newer report has garnered criticism for its alleged bias as well.

== Jenkins Commission ==
Sir John Jenkins was asked to draw up a report on the philosophy and values and alleged connections with extremism and violence by the Muslim Brotherhood. Other key players in the review team were Sir Kim Darroch, the prime minister's national security adviser, Sir John Sawers, the current chief of the Secret Intelligence Service (MI6) and Charles Farr, at the time of writing Director General of the Office for Security and Counter Terrorism in the Home Office. The final authors of the review were Sir John Jenkins and Charles Farr.

== Review period ==
The investigative part of the review was completed in July 2014. The government also asked interested parties to submit evidence to be used in the review.

Egyptian Muslim Brotherhood leaders Ibrahim Munir Mustafa, Secretary-General Mahmoud Hussein, as well as the leader of the Tunisian Ennahdha party, Rached Ghannouchi, have given expert evidence. As well as former general comptroller of the Muslim Brotherhood in Jordan, Hammam bin Said, and his deputy Zaki bin Arshid, and Saad Eddine Othmani, a leading figure of the Moroccan Islamist Justice and Development Party were interviewed by the commission. Then the drafting process took some time with The Daily Times reporting mid September 2014 that the report was handed over the Prime Minister's office.

== Final report and main findings ==
The final report by the Jenkins Commission remains classified but the publication of the findings of the report were delayed multiple times until they were released in a session of the House of Commons on 17 December 2015.

== First part of the report ==
The findings are presented in two main parts. The first part was done by Sir John Jenkins, he examined the development, ideology and structures of the Muslim Brotherhood, historically and through its foundational writings. The four main subjects discussed by Jenkins were focused on the Muslim Brotherhoods:

- Foundational ideology and structures
- The Muslim Brotherhood in Egypt
- The Muslim Brotherhood internationally
- The Muslim Brotherhood, violence and terrorism

=== Conclusions from first part of the main findings ===
Some of the conclusions of the first part are:

"Hassan al Banna accepted the political utility of violence, and the Brotherhood conducted attacks, including political assassinations and attempted assassinations against Egyptian state targets and both British and Jewish interests during his lifetime;"

"in return for freedom to reorganise politically and socially in Egypt in the 1970s, the Egyptian Muslim Brotherhood officially disowned violence;"

"However, the Muslim Brotherhood at all levels have repeatedly defended Hamas attacks against Israel, including the use of suicide bombers and the killing of civilians. The Muslim Brotherhood facilitate funding for Hamas. The leadership of the Egyptian Muslim Brotherhood, its Jordanian counterpart and Hamas are closely connected. There are wider links with Muslim Brotherhood affiliates throughout the region. Senior members of the Muslim Brotherhood routinely use virulent, anti-Semitic language;"

"Senior Muslim Brotherhood figures and associates have justified attacks against coalition forces in Iraq and Afghanistan;"

"Some members of the Muslim Brotherhood (mainly in non Muslim countries) have strongly criticised Al Qaida. But leaders in the Muslim Brotherhood have claimed that the attacks on 09/11 were fabricated by the US, and that the so called ‘war on terrorism’ is a pretext to attack Muslims."

"Sir John concluded that it was not possible to reconcile these views with the claim made by the Egyptian Muslim Brotherhood in their evidence to the review that "the Muslim Brotherhood has consistently adhered to peaceful means of opposition, renouncing all forms of violence throughout its existence".

== Second part of the report ==
The second part of the report on the Muslim Brotherhood in the United Kingdom was written by Charles Farr. He examined in detail the Muslim Brotherhood's development, ideology and activities in the UK.

=== Conclusions from second part of the main findings ===
"In the 1990s the Muslim Brotherhood and their associates established public facing and apparently national organisations in the UK to promote their views. None were openly identified with the Muslim Brotherhood and membership of the Muslim Brotherhood remained (and still remains) a secret. But for some years the Muslim Brotherhood shaped the new Islamic Society of Britain (ISB), dominated the Muslim Association of Britain (MAB) and played an important role in establishing and then running the Muslim Council of Britain (MCB). MAB became politically active, notably in connection with Palestine and Iraq, and promoted candidates in national and local elections. The MCB sought and obtained a dialogue with Government."

"Mr Farr found that as of mid-2014 the Brotherhood in the UK comprised a range of organisations, loosely associated together but without common command and control or a single leader. Some of these organisations had emerged in and from the UK. Others represented third country Brotherhood organisations using London as a base for overseas activities."

"The military wing of Hamas was proscribed in the UK as a terrorist organisation in 2001 but Hamas has been active here for over ten years."

"Muslim Brotherhood organisations in the UK – including charities – are connected to counterparts elsewhere in Europe. MAB are associated with the Federation of Islamic Organisations in Europe (FIOE), established by the Muslim Brotherhood in 1989. FIOE subsequently created the European Council for Fatwa and Research, another pan European Muslim Brotherhood body, intended to provide religious and social guidance to Muslims living in Europe."

== Final conclusions ==
"The Muslim Brotherhood have promoted a radical, transformative politics, at odds with a millennium of Islamic jurisprudence and statecraft"

The Muslim Brotherhood generally tries to transform and remodel individuals and communities through a bottom up approach and where possible participate in politics. But if needed the Muslim Brotherhood is willing to use violence and terror in pursuit of their long term goals;

The Muslim Brotherhood in the West uses double speak, the public narrative in the West in English the message is significantly different than in Arabic;

"There is little evidence that the experience of power in Egypt has caused a rethinking in the Muslim Brotherhood of its ideology or conduct."

"Much about the Muslim Brotherhood in the UK remains secretive, including membership, fund raising and educational programmes. But Muslim Brotherhood associates and affiliates here have at times had significant influence on the largest UK Muslim student organisation, national organisations which have claimed to represent Muslim communities (and on that basis have sought and had a dialogue with Government), charities and some mosques. Though their domestic influence has declined organisations associated with the Muslim Brotherhood continue to have an influence here which is disproportionate to their size;"

"the Muslim Brotherhood in the UK claimed to act in support of Muslim communities here and use London as a base for activism elsewhere, notably with other Muslim Brotherhood organisations in Europe, in Egypt and the occupied Palestinian territories and in the Gulf. This activity is sometimes secretive, if not clandestine;"

The Muslim Brotherhood have been publicly committed to political engagement in the United Kingdom.

"Aspects of Muslim Brotherhood ideology and tactics, in this country and overseas, are contrary to our values and have been contrary to our national interests and our national security.”

== Foreign Affairs Select Committee’s recent criticism of 2014 report ==
In November 2016, Britain's Foreign Affairs Select Committee, headed by Crispin Blunt, published a new report which harshly criticized the 2014 report. This most recent report was drafted over a period of nine months and specifically denounced the initial selection of Sir John Jenkins:

"Notwithstanding his knowledge, experience, and professional integrity, Sir John Jenkins’s concurrent service as UK ambassador to Saudi Arabia made his appointment to lead the Muslim Brotherhood Review misguided. It created the impression that a foreign state, which was an interested party, had a private window into the conduct of a UK Government inquiry...This has undermined confidence in the impartiality of the FCO’s work on such an important and contentious subject."

In their own words, the authors of this 2016 report stated their intent was to conduct an inquiry into ‘political Islam’, its characteristics, and how well the Foreign and Commonwealth Office (FCO) has understood and engaged with ‘political-Islamist’ groups."

Crispin Blunt has also encountered judgement for reportedly being a Muslim Brotherhood advocate, as he has sat in on meetings with the group and has spoken publicly about how the Brotherhood should not have been ousted in 2013.

=== Stated shortcomings of 2014 report ===
The Committee lists three main shortcomings of the prior report:

- Failure to mention the Muslim Brotherhood’s ousting in 2013, despite democratic election, and minimization of the amount of Brotherhood sympathizers killed in the process
- Selection of Sir John Jenkins
- Neglect to release evidence used as the basis for the review

=== Committee’s mild assessment of the Muslim Brotherhood ===
Overall, the Committee’s assessment attempts to sheds the Muslim Brotherhood in a better light than the previous assessment.

In its opening assessment summary of political Islam, the authors provide the caveat that "the Muslim Brotherhood is a secretive group, with an ambiguous international structure. But this is understandable given the repression it now experiences".

A few other highlights include:

- The report somewhat outlines the Muslim Brotherhood structure and funding, based upon documents directly submitted by the group itself to the Committee, and states that "the Muslim Brotherhood continues to be a powerful and organized voice in Egypt".
- As far as the Brotherhood's varying public messaging through translations, the Committee provides evidence from certain witnesses that argue "political Islamists may have positive and pragmatic reasons for varying their messaging", rather than attempting to be deceptive. However, the Committee does concede that the "FCO is right to judge political Islamists by both their words and their actions".
- Another point the Committee makes is actually in agreement with the prior report that the Brotherhood should not be designated as a terrorist organization. The Committee states "the evidence so far in Egypt is that if the Muslim Brotherhood supported or condoned violence, then Egypt would be a far more violent place today".
