= Al Dawa =

Arabic monthly political magazine in Egypt

- Managing editor: Umar Al Tilmisani
- Categories: Political magazine
- Frequency: Monthly
- Publisher: Islamic Publication and Distribution Company
- Founder: Salih Ashmawi
- Founded: 1951; 1976 (restart)
- First issue: 3 January 1951; June 1976 (second period)
- Final issue: August 1981
- Country: Egypt
- Based in: Cairo
- Language: Arabic

Al Dawa (Arabic: The Call) was an Arabic language monthly political magazine which was published in Egypt in two periods, 1951–1953 and 1976–1981. The publication was one of the media outlets connected to the Muslim Brotherhood in Egypt.

== History and profile ==
Al Dawa was published in two periods, first between 1951 and 1953 and between 1976 and 1981. In each period it was an organ of the Muslim Brotherhood. Its restart in 1976 referred to the semi-official resurgence of the group. In addition, Al Dawa was one of the three Islamic publications in Egypt in this period.

=== First period (1951–1953) ===
Al Dawa was first published on 3 January 1951, and its founder was Salih Ashmawi. The magazine was published on a monthly basis. In this phase the magazine was very radical and primarily targeted external opponents, namely Jews, Christians, atheist Communists and seculars. It also served for other goals. First it disseminated the views of the Brotherhood of which the members were subject to the frequent trials and arrests under the strict government practices against the group. In addition, Al Dawa was a platform to criticize the Brotherhood leader Hassan Al Hudaybi with whom Salih Ashmawi had conflicts. One of the most significant regular contributors was Sayyid Qutb during this period. Al Dawa was banned in 1953.

=== Second period (1976–1981) ===
Al Dawa was restarted in 1976, and the first issue appeared in June 1976 when the Muslim Brotherhood was allowed to publish a magazine. The relaunch of the magazine occurred when Salih Ashmawi asked Umar Al Tilmisani, a member of the Brotherhood, to help him to revive it. It was published by the Islamic Publication and Distribution Company on a monthly basis. The magazine was managed by Umar Al Tilmisani who also published many articles in Al Dawa and was the chair of the publishing company. It was used by the Brotherhood to disseminate their ideology and views.

From the third issue published in September 1976 Al Dawa became very aggressive similar to its first period. For instance, it asked President Anwar Sadat to establish an Islamic order in the country in cooperation with Saudi Arabia to eliminate the communist-leftist atheism. In addition, in the fourth issue dated October 1976 its attacks began in relation to Sadat's policies concerning education, inflation, housing and transportation. The aggression of the magazine increased immediately after the visit of Sadat to Israel in 1977. Umar Al Tilmisani published an article in Al Dawa in October 1978 arguing that Egypt should carry out jihad against Israel, but it should be only under the command of the head of state.

Al Dawa praised the Islamic revolution occurred in February 1979 in Iran portraying it as a model for the Muslim Brotherhood to achieve its goals. The magazine attacked other Egyptian publications which described the Iranian revolution as an ultra-conservative movement. When former Shah of Iran, Mohammad Reza Pahlavi, underwent surgery at the Military Hospital in Cairo in March 1980, Al Dawa claimed that if the Shah would stay in Egypt, it would contradict Islam.

Unlike other Islamic publications in the country Al Dawa exhibited a non-violent opposition against the Camp David Accords and the settlement between Egypt and Israel in 1979, although it condemned the Accords. Following these overt criticisms President Anwar Sadat told Umar Al Tilmisani that he would ban the magazine if such negative views would continue. He also reminded Al Tilmisani that the title had been in circulation without any legal license which he turned a blind eye. In May 1979 the magazine was temporarily suspended. However, the magazine continued its opposition against both Jews and Zionists which was also expressed in its children's supplement in October 1980.

In 1981 President Anwar Sadat banned all opposition publications, including Al Dawa of which the final issue was published in August that year. The magazine featured more than 3,000 articles written by nearly 350 authors between 1976 and 1981. During this period major contributors included Muhammad ‘Abdal-Quddus, Mostafa Mashhur, Muhammad ‘Abdallah Al Khatib, Salih Ashmawi, Jabir Rizq and Zaynab Al Ghazali. The latter published articles in Al Dawa from 1976, and her articles were mostly about the biographies of the early Muslim women.
