= Umar al-Tilmisani =

Third General Guide of the Egyptian Muslim Brotherhood

Umar al-Tilmisani عمر التلمساني
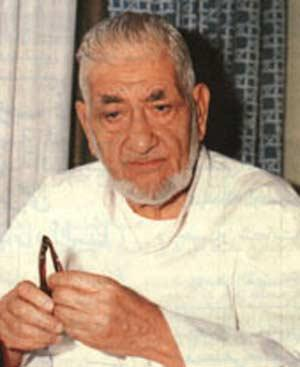

3rd General Guide of the Egyptian Muslim Brotherhood
- In office 11 November 1973 – 22 May 1986
- Preceded by: Hassan al-Hudaybi
- Succeeded by: Muhammad Hamid Abu al-Nasr

Personal details
- Born: 4 November 1904 Cairo, Egypt
- Died: 22 May 1986 (aged 81) Cairo, Egypt

'Umar al-Tilmisani, also Omar el-tilmisany (Arabic: عمر التلمساني, IPA: [ˈʕomɑɾˤ et.telmeˈsæːni]; most often transliterated as Omar el Telmesany or Telmesani ) (4 November 1904 – 22 May 1986) was the third General Guide (Murshid al-'Am) of the Egyptian Muslim Brotherhood. He headed the Egyptian Islamist organization from 1972 until 1986. Al-Tilmisani headed the Muslim Brotherhood during a period of cooperation and, some observers suggest, cooptation by the Egyptian state. While the Brothers were not precisely legal during Tilmisani's term, they were tolerated and encouraged by Egypt's former President Sadat as a bulwark against both leftist opponents and more Islamists.

== Biography ==
Al-Tilmisani was born in the Darb al-Ahmar district of Cairo in 1904. A lawyer, al-Tilmisani joined the Brothers in 1933, and was inducted into the organization by its founding General Guide, Hassan al-Banna.

Al-Tilmisani was from a family of prominent landowners, which owned 300 feddans (acres) and seven houses. His deputy, and a later successor as General Guide, Mustafa Mashhur, was also from a family of wealthy landowners. Their prominence and social status led historian Robert Springborg to conclude at the end of the 1980s: "It can reasonably be claimed that those currently in control of the Muslim Brothers are of the Islamic infitah bourgeoisie who 'bought' the organization with resources acquired through collaboration with the Sadat regime".

Salih Ashmawi, a senior Brotherhood member until his expulsion in 1953, asked al-Tilmisani to help him in reviving Al Dawa which had been published in the period 1951–1953 as an official organ of the group. Al-Tilmisani also managed the journal until its demise in 1981. In addition, he published many articles in the journal which appeared on the first page.

Despite heading the group during this period of cooperation with the state, al-Tilmisani was imprisoned three times, once in 1954, as an activist during the Nasser years, and twice while at the head of the group, during Sadat's mass roundup of opponents in 1981, and again under Hosni Mubarak in 1984.

Religious titles
Preceded by Hassan al-Hudaybi	General Guide of the Muslim Brotherhood; 1972–1986	Succeeded by Muhammad Hamid Abu al-Nasr
