= Mohammed Badie =

Egyptian politician (born 1943)

Mohammed Badie محمد بديع
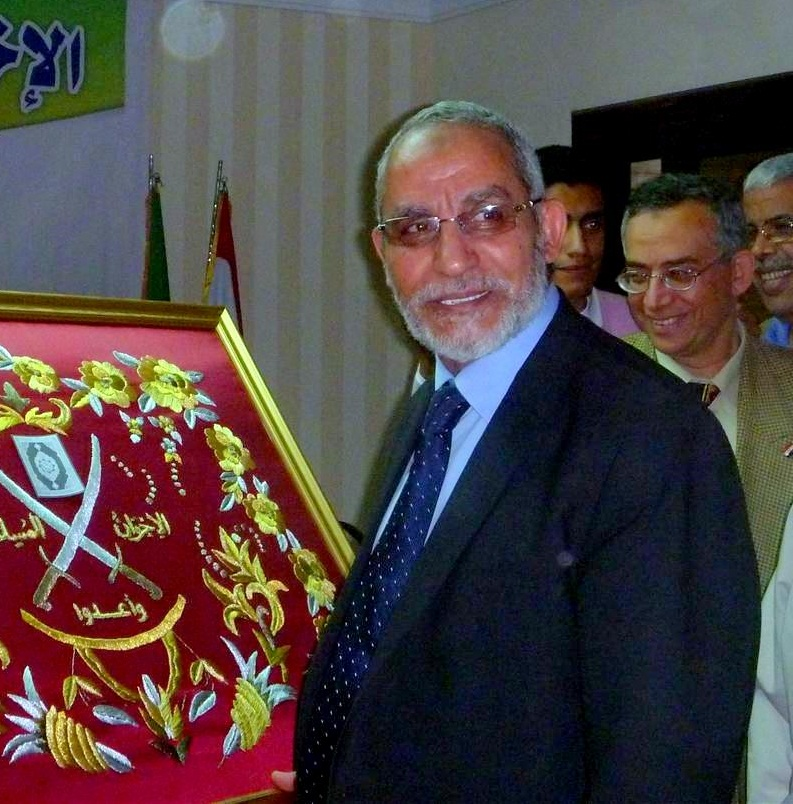
- Badie in 2011

8th General Guide of the Muslim Brotherhood in Egypt
- In office 16 January 2010 – 3 July 2013
- Preceded by: Mohammed Mahdi Akef
- Succeeded by: Mahmoud Ezzat

Personal details
- Born: 7 August 1943 (age 83) El Mahalla El Kubra, Egypt
- Children: 4
- Education: Cairo University

Mohammed Badie (Arabic: محمد بديع عبد المجيد سامي Muḥammad Badīʿ, IPA: [mæˈħæmmæd bæˈdiːʕ]; born 7 August 1943) is the eighth Supreme Guide of the Muslim Brotherhood.

He has been heading the Egyptian branch of the international Muslim Brotherhood organization since 2010. Before becoming the general guide, Badie had been a member of the group's governing council, the Guidance Bureau, since 1996.

He was arrested by the Egyptian authorities on 20 August 2013, and Dr. Mahmoud Ezzat became the acting general guide of the Muslim Brotherhood. Then after Dr. Mahmoud Ezzat was arrested on 28 August 2020, Ibrahim Munir became the acting general guide of the Muslim Brotherhood. On 13 October 2021, the Egyptian Muslim Brotherhood Consultative Assembly (Shoura) made a decision to withdraw confidence from Ibrahim Munir and relieve him of his responsibility in the Muslim Brotherhood in Egypt. The assembly decided to assign an acting committee for general guide role and announced that in an official statement on 13 November 2021, and later announced Dr. Mostafa Tolba as the committee's representative on 17 December 2021. On 16 November 2022, the Assembly (Shoura) made a new decision to appoint Prof. Dr. Mahmoud Hussein as the acting general guide of the Muslim Brotherhood according to the general regulation, and Dr. Mostafa Tolba announced the decision by himself.

On 28 April 2014, after an eight-minute trial in which Badie could not present his defence, he was sentenced to death, along with 682 others who are allegedly Muslim Brotherhood supporters. He was sentenced to life in prison on 15 September 2014, and was sentenced to death on 11 April 2015, along with thirteen other senior Muslim Brotherhood members. He received a sixth life sentence on 22 August 2015 and a seventh on 8 May 2017.

Egypt's highest appeals court upheld the 2019 conviction of Badie on charges related to killing policemen and organising mass jail-breaks during Egypt's 2011 uprising, alongside those of 10 other leaders of the group.

== Biography ==
=== Early life ===
Badie was born on 7 August 1943 in the industrial city of Mahalla al-Kubra. He received a degree in veterinary medicine at Cairo in 1965.

The same year, he was arrested for the first time for his political activity in the Muslim Brotherhood, along with Muslim Brotherhood leader Sayyid Qutb, during a nationwide roundup of activists; he was sentenced to 15 years in prison by a military tribunal. After 9 years, he was paroled along with almost all other Brotherhood prisoners in 1974 by the Egyptian president, Anwar al-Sadat. Badi'e went on to continue his studies and begin a teaching career at various Egyptian universities. He became a part-time professor of pathology at the veterinary school of Beni Suef University.

=== 2013 crisis, arrest, and trials ===
In July 2013, Egyptian president Mohammed Morsi, a member of the Muslim Brotherhood, was removed by a coup d'état after the June protests. A travel ban was put on Badie as well as Badie's deputy Khairat el-Shater. Badie's arrest was ordered on 10 July 2013 for "inciting the violence in Cairo on Monday in which more than 50 people were killed." On 14 July 2013 Egypt's military-installed prosecutor general Hisham Barakat ordered his assets to be frozen. Badie was arrested on 20 August 2013. His two deputies were also arrested and he was due to stand trial on 25 August. After the arrest of Badie, the Muslim Brotherhood appointed Mahmoud Ezzat as the acting guide.

Badie then has been tried in the following cases:

- Together with eighteen other defendants, he has been accused at Cairo Criminal Court of inciting the murder of nine protesters who stormed the Brotherhood's Cairo headquarters on 30 June. On 29 October 2013, a three-judge panel stepped down from the proceedings, citing "uneasiness" over the trial as trial proceedings were disrupted by named defendants. On 11 December 2013, a second panel of judges withdrew from the trial.
- On 7 June 2014, 47 defendants (ten of them in absentia) including Badie were tried at the Criminal Court of Shubra el-Kheima for inciting murder and violence, cutting off roads, threatening public order, and resisting authorities, especially referring to a demonstration in the town of Qalyub in July 2013 (notably blocking a highway), in the course of which at least two people were killed. Along with nine others, Badie was sentenced to death, while there was no sentence yet for additional 37 defendants in the case. On 5 July 2014 ten of them were sentenced to death by the Banha Criminal Court, the remaining including Badie to life in prison.
- On 15 July 2013, five persons died in clashes in Giza, notably in the Al-Bahr Al-Azam area near a police building. On 8 September 2013, Egypt's prosecutor-general referred Badie and 14 others to the criminal court, accusing them of being responsible for the incidents. Several trial sessions were reported in the news, until on 19 June 2014, Giza Criminal Court sentenced Badie, Muslim Brotherhood senior members Mohamed Beltagy and Essam el-Erian, as well as 11 others to death for inciting violence.
- In an eight-minute trial without an opportunity for a defense on 28 April 2014, Badie and 682 others were found guilty and sentenced to die by judge Said Youssef in a court in Minya, referring to an attack on a police station in the Minya Governorate on 14 August 2013 when 11 policemen and 2 civilians were killed. The same judge confirmed the death sentence on 21 June 2014 in 183 cases, including Badie's. Two months later, Egypt's Grand Mufti commuted the death sentence to a life sentence for Badie and five others. Egyptian law requires any capital sentence to be referred to the Grand Mufti, the highest Islamist religious authority, for an opinion before any execution can take place.
- In a 2015 trial, a Cairo court sentenced Badie and 18 other prominent Brotherhood figures to life in prison over an attack on a police station in 2013. Charges ranged from murder and inciting violence to stealing weapons and destruction of public and private property. The court also handed the same sentence to 76 others in absentia.
- On 30 May 2016, an Egyptian court also sentenced Badie and 35 other people to life imprisonment for inciting violence in the Suez Canal city of Ismailia that led to the killing of three people in July 2013.
- In 2017, Egypt's Court of Cassation accepted the appeal of Badie and 49 other defendants against the death sentences received for the 2013 police station attacks. The court ordered a retrial for the charges.
- Badie returned to court in Giza in 2017 to face charges of "preparing an operations room to confront the state and create chaos in the country following the dismantling of the Rabaa al-Adawiya sit-in" and "planning to burn public property and churches", and he received another life sentence.

=== 2019–2021: sentence and appeal ===
- A ruling on 11 July upheld the 2019 conviction by a Cairo criminal court of all 10, including Mohamed Badie, of charges related to killing policemen and organising mass jail-breaks during Egypt's 2011 uprising. The defendants were found guilty of helping about 20,000 prisoners escape, and of undermining national security by conspiring with foreign armed groups – the Palestinian group, Hamas, and Lebanon's Iran-backed Hezbollah. All of the sentences, which the court considered on appeal, are final.

=== 2024: Platform Incidents case ===
- On 4 March 2024, an Egyptian court sentenced Badie and seven other Muslim Brotherhood figures to death in the "Platform Incidents" case. The other defendants sentenced to death were Mahmoud Ezzat, Mohamed Beltagy, Amr Zaki, Osama Yassin, Safwat Hegazy, Essam Abdel Majid, and Mohamed Abdel Maqsoud. The court also sentenced 37 defendants to life imprisonment, six to 15 years' imprisonment, and seven to 10 years' imprisonment, while acquitting 21 defendants.

== Statements ==
=== Israel ===
In a weekly sermon, titled "How Islam Confronts the Oppression and Tyranny [against the Muslims]," Mohammed Badie accused the Arab and Muslim regimes of avoiding confrontation with "the Zionist entity" and the United States, and also of disregarding "Allah's commandment to wage jihad for His sake with [their] money and [their] lives, so that Allah's word will reign supreme and the infidels' word will be inferior." Badie stated that the U.S. is immoral and doomed to collapse. He accused the Palestinian Authority of "selling out" the Palestinian cause, adding that a third intifada was about to erupt. Badie also stated that "Resistance is the only solution against the Zio-American arrogance and tyranny, and all we need is for the Arab and Muslim peoples to stand behind it and support it."

In July 2012, during his weekly sermon, Mohammed Badie stated that Israelis are "rapists" of Jerusalem, and called on all Muslims to "wage jihad with their money and their selves to free al-Quds." He described the creation of Israel in international law as an "alleged, illusory right."

In October 2012, Badie alleged that "The Jews have dominated the land, spread corruption on earth, spilled the blood of believers and in their actions profaned holy places, including their own." As such, he demanded that the Arab world reject negotiations with Israel in favour of "holy Jihad," saying that "the Zionists only understand force" and while alleging that allowing Jews to pray on the Temple Mount, Judaism's holiest site, would result in the destruction of Al-Aqsa.

=== Operation Pillar of Defense ===
Badie denounced peace efforts with Israel, urging holy war against Israel, on 22 November 2012—just a day after Egyptian President Mohammed Morsi succeeded in brokering a truce to end eight days of Israel-Hamas fighting. Badie says "jihad is obligatory" for Muslims and that peace deals with Israel are a "game of grand deception." He says there's been enough negotiations, the "enemy knows nothing but the language of force."

=== Overthrow of Mohamed Morsi ===
In July 2013, Badie condemned the removal of Egyptian president Mohamed Morsi by the Egyptian military stating "I swear by God that what Gen. Abdel-Fattah el-Sisi did in Egypt is more criminal than if he had carried an axe and demolished the holy Kaaba, stone by stone."

== Personal life ==
Badie has four children, three daughters and a son. His son, Ammar, was killed in the clashes in Cairo on 16 August 2013.

== See also ==
- History of the Muslim Brotherhood in Egypt

Religious titles
Preceded by Mohammed Mahdi Akef	General Guide of the Muslim Brotherhood; 2010–present	Incumbent
