= Mohammed Mahdi Akef =

Seventh General Guide of the Egyptian Muslim Brotherhood

Muhammad Mahdi Akef محمد مهدي عاكف
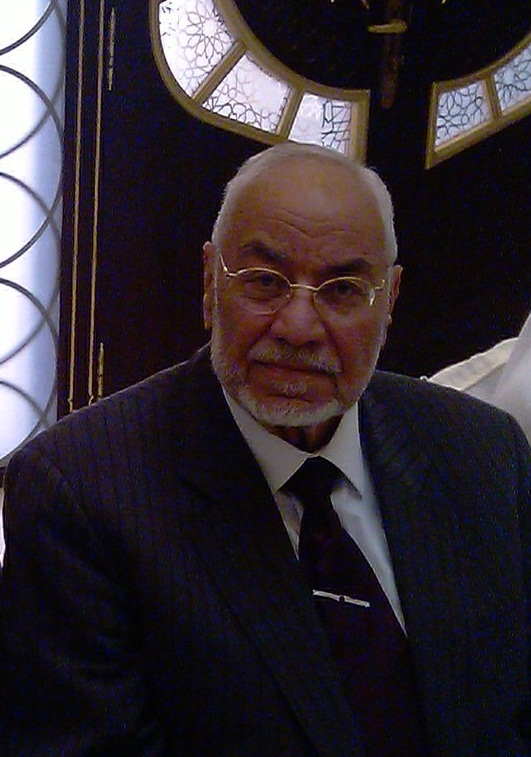

7th General Guide of the Egyptian Muslim Brotherhood
- In office 8 January 2004 – 8 January 2010
- Preceded by: Ma'mun al-Hudaybi
- Succeeded by: Mohammed Badie

Personal details
- Born: July 12, 1928 Kafr Awad Al-Seneita, Dakahlia, Egypt
- Died: September 22, 2017 (aged 89) Cairo, Egypt
- Education: Ain Shams University

Mohammed Mahdi Akef (Arabic: محمد مهدي عاكف; July 12, 1928 – September 22, 2017) was the head of the Muslim Brotherhood, an Egypt-based Islamic political movement, from 2004 until 2010. He assumed the post, that of "general guide" (Arabic: المرشد العام) (frequently translated as "chairman") upon the death of his predecessor, Ma'mun al-Hudaybi. Akef was arrested on 4 July 2013. On 14 July 2013 Egypt's new prosecutor general Hisham Barakat ordered his assets to be frozen.

== Early life ==
Akef was born in 1928 in Kafr Awad Al Seneita –Aga - Dakahlia Governorate, in the north of Egypt. The year of his birth was the year the Muslim Brotherhood Movement was founded.

Akef obtained his Primary Certificate of Education at Al Mansoura Primary School, and obtained his Secondary Certificate of Education at Cairo- Fuad 1st Secondary School. He then joined the Higher Institute of Physical Education and graduated in May 1950, after which he worked as a teacher at Fuad 1st Secondary School.

== Career ==
He first became involved with the Muslim Brotherhood in 1940, which was then led by Hassan al Banna.

Akef joined the Faculty of Law and assumed responsibility for the Brotherhood's training camps at Ibrahim University (present-day Ain Shams University). This was during the struggle against the British occupation in the Canal preceding the 1952 Revolution, after which he left responsibility to Kamaleddin Hussein, then National Guard Chief. The last Sections he headed in the Muslim Brotherhood before 1954 were both the Students Section and the PE Section at the Groups HQ.

He was arrested on 1 August 1954 and stood trial on charges including smuggling Major General Abdul Munem Abderraoof (one of the army chiefs who spearheaded the ouster and expulsion of King Farouq) and was sentenced to death in absentia before the ruling was commuted to life imprisonment. Akef was released in 1974 and was reappointed General Manager of Youth (a department affiliated to the Ministry of Reconstruction). He then moved to Riyadh, Saudi Arabia to work as an advisor for the World Assembly of Muslim Youth and was in charge of its camps and conferences. He took part in organizing some of the biggest camps for the Muslim youth in the world (including in Saudi Arabia, Jordan, Malaysia, Bangladesh, Turkey, Australia, Mali, Kenya, Cyprus, Germany, Britain and the United States). He assumed the position of Director of Islamic Centre in Munich.

He has been a member of the Steering Bureau (Guidance Bureau) of the Muslim Brotherhood, since 1987.

He was elected Member of Parliament in 1987 for the East Cairo electoral constituency. In 1996, he was court-martialed, charged with being head of the Muslim Brotherhood International Organization, and was sentenced to three years. He was released in 1999.

He oversaw the Brotherhood at the time of the Egyptian parliamentary elections of 2005 in which Islamists gained a strong opposition foothold (88/454 seats).

Egyptian newspapers reported in October 2009 that Akef had resigned as the general guide of the Muslim Brotherhood after a dispute among various leaders in the group. However the following day reports on the Muslim Brotherhood website stated that Akef had not resigned and would continue to serve as the group's general guide until elections in January 2010.

Following Sisi's military takeover of Egypt, the Brotherhood was deemed a terrorist group by the new regime and Akef was arrested and sentenced to life imprisonment.

== Political views ==
Akef has been described as "unapologetic about charges by reformist members regarding the reluctance of the Ikhwan [Muslim Brotherhood] to engage more proactively in opposition to the Mubarak regime in the first decade of the twenty-first century" (27). However, in 2005, he would call Mubarak's rule "failed and finished." In 2007, he is reported by historian Fawaz Gerges as having stated: "Critics who call on us to protest in the streets do not think about the grave consequences. Unlike other small groups, we, as the biggest organization, act responsibly and measure our actions carefully...I have to protect the movement." He is said to have "belittled questions related to the dominance of the old guard" even as younger reformist members sought to establish a stronger place in the Brotherhood's leadership.

He denounced what he called "the myth of the Holocaust" in 2005, defending Iranian president Mahmoud Ahmadinejad's denial of the Holocaust, and accused the United States of attacking anyone who raised questions about it. He considered anti-American insurgents in Iraq to be "freedom fighters."

== Personal life ==
His daughter is married to Mahmoud Ezzat, with whom she has five children with.

== Death ==
Akef's health deteriorated while he was imprisoned by the Egyptian authorities after the 2013 Egyptian coup d'état. His daughter stated that he was isolated in the prison hospital and was only allowed a visit once a week, despite his old age and poor health. He died on 22 September 2017 at the age of 89.

== See also ==
- History of the Muslim Brotherhood in Egypt

Religious titles
Preceded by Ma'mun al-Hudaybi	General Guide of the Muslim Brotherhood; 2004–2010	Succeeded by Mohammed Badie
