= Fawaz Gerges =

Lebanese-American academic and author

Fawaz A. Gerges
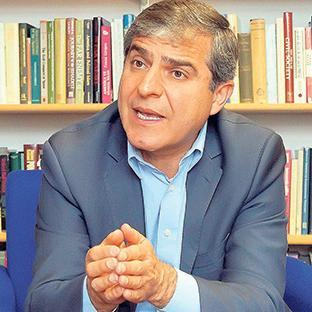
- Born: 1958 (age 67–68); Lebanon
- Citizenship: United States
- Spouse: Nora Colton

Academic background
- Education: London School of Economics; University of Oxford

Academic work
- Discipline: Professor of International Relations
- Sub-discipline: Specialist on social movements
- Institutions: London School of Economics, Sarah Lawrence College, Oxford University, Harvard University, Columbia University, Princeton University
- Main interests: International relations, Middle East, Superpowers, Geopolitics, American foreign policy, Muslim Brotherhood, Mujahideen, Al Qaeda, ISIS

Fawaz A. Gerges (Arabic: فواز جرجس; Lebanese pronunciation: [fawˈwaːz ˈʒeɾʒes]) is a Lebanese-American academic and author with expertise on the Middle East, U.S. foreign policy, international relations, social movements, and relations between the Islamic and Western worlds.

Gerges is currently a professor of Middle East Politics and International Relations at the London School of Economics and Political Science. He holds the Emirates Chair of the Contemporary Middle East at the LSE, and he was the inaugural Director of the LSE's Middle East Centre from 2010 to 2013.

Gerges's book What Really Went Wrong: The West and the Failure of Democracy in the Middle East was published by Yale University Press in May 2024. The book considers how Middle Eastern history might have been different if American leaders after the end of the Second World War had encouraged independent Middle Eastern leaders and peoples instead of supporting potentates, autocrats, and strongmen.

== Biography ==
Fawaz A. Gerges was born into a Greek Orthodox family in 1959 in Beirut, Lebanon. During the Lebanese Civil War, his hometown was damaged by the fighting, forcing his family to flee to Syria and take refuge in Christian monasteries. Gerges stayed in Syria for a year before moving to the United States.

Gerges earned a MSc at the London School of Economics and a DPhil from Oxford University. He taught at Oxford, Harvard, and Columbia universities and was a research fellow at Princeton University for two years. He held the Christian A. Johnson Endeavor Foundation Chair in Middle Eastern Studies and International Affairs at Sarah Lawrence College.

Gerges is the author of numerous books and publications, including: Making the Arab World: Nasser, Qutb, and the Clash That Shaped the Middle East (2018), Journey of the Jihadist: Inside Muslim Militancy (2007), and The Far Enemy: Why Jihad Went Global (2009).

The Washington Post selected The Far Enemy as one of the best 15 books published in the field. Journey of the Jihadist was on the best-selling list of Barnes & Noble and Foreign Affairs magazine for several months.

Writing in Foreign Affairs, Shadi Hamid called Making the Arab World "a fascinating and deeply researched revisionist history—one that sheds light on the forces still roiling in Egypt under the surface calm of Sisi's rule. . . . Gerges' reexamination of a crucial period in Egyptian history usefully illustrates how all ideologies—even the ones that seem most fixed and unyielding—are in fact fluid and contingent on events."

On the ten-year anniversary of 9/11, Oxford University Press released Gerges's book, The Rise and Fall of Al Qaeda (2011). Obama and the Middle East (May 2012) was published by Pelgrave Macmillan one year later.

Gerges has appeared on television and radio networks throughout the world, including CNN, ABC, CBS, NPR, the BBC and Al Jazeera. During the weeks leading up to the 2003 U.S. invasion of Iraq, he was a regular guest on The Oprah Winfrey Show, PBS's The NewsHour with Jim Lehrer and The Charlie Rose Show.

At the occasion of the 10-year anniversary of the Arab Spring protests, Gerges warned that the root causes for social unrest in the Arab World were still simmering, adding that "the status quo is untenable, and the next explosion will be catastrophic."

== Personal life ==
Gerges is married to Professor Nora Colton, an economist and Director of the University College of London's Global Business School For Health. The couple have four children.

Gerges was born during a Lebanese civil war in 1958 and was part of the 1975 war generation. He states, "My generation was wiped out—killed, mutilated and polluted by sectarian-tribal conflict between 1975 and 1990, or forced into exile." Although Gerges immigrated to the United States to escape the conflict, his younger brother, Bassam, was killed during the war in 1990. Gerges has lived most of his life in the United States and now resides in London.

== Works ==
- Gerges, Fawaz A. (2025). The Great Betrayal: The Struggle for Freedom and Democracy in the Middle East . Princeton University Press. ISBN 978-0691176635.
- Gerges, Fawaz A. (2024). What Really Went Wrong: The West and the Failure of Democracy in the Middle East. Yale University Press. ISBN 978-0300259575.
- Gerges, Fawaz A. (2018). Making the Arab World: Nasser, Qutb, and the Clash That Shaped the Middle East. Princeton University Press. ISBN 9780691167886.
- Gerges, Fawaz A. (2016). ISIS: A History. Princeton University Press. ISBN 9780691170008.
- Gerges, Fawaz A. (2015). Contentious Politics in the Middle East: Popular Resistance and Marginalized Activism beyond the Arab Uprisings. Palgrave Macmillan. ISBN 9781137537218
- Gerges, Fawaz A. (2013). The New Middle East: Protest and Revolution in the Arab World. Cambridge University Press. ISBN 978-1107616882.
- Gerges, Fawaz A. (2012). Obama and the Middle East: The End of America's Moment?. Palgrave Macmillan. ISBN 978-0230113817.
- Gerges, Fawaz A. (2011). The Rise and Fall of Al Qaeda. Oxford University Press.
- Gerges, Fawaz A.; Wynbrandt, James (2009). A Brief History of Pakistan. Facts On File. ISBN 978-0-8160-6184-6.
- Gerges, Fawaz A. (2009). The Far Enemy. Cambridge University Press. ISBN 978-0521737432.
- Gerges, Fawaz A. (2006). Journey of the Jihadist: Inside Muslim Militancy. Harcourt. ISBN 0-15-101213-X.
- Gerges, Fawaz A. (2005). The Far Enemy: Why Jihad Went Global. Cambridge University Press. ISBN 0-521-79140-5.
- Gerges, Fawaz A.; Wynbrandt, James (2004). A Brief History of Saudi Arabia. Checkmark Books. ISBN 0-8160-5795-8.
- Gerges, Fawaz A. (1999). America and Political Islam: Clash of Cultures or Clash of Interests?. Cambridge University Press. ISBN 0-521-63957-3.
- Gerges, Fawaz A. (1994). The Superpowers and the Middle East: Regional and International Politics, 1955–1967. Westview Press. ISBN 0-8133-8696-9.
