= Hassan al-Hudaybi =

Second General Guide of the Egyptian Muslim Brotherhood (1891–1973)

Hassan al-Hudaybi حسن الهضيبي
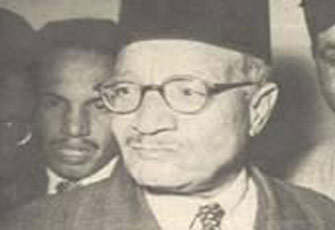

2nd General Guide of the Egyptian Muslim Brotherhood
- In office 1951 – 11 November 1973
- Preceded by: Hassan al-Banna
- Succeeded by: Umar al-Tilmisani

Personal details
- Born: December 1891 Arab al-Suwaliha, Qalyubiyya, Egypt
- Died: November 11, 1973 (aged 81) Cairo, Egypt
- Children: Ma'mun al-Hudaybi

Hassan al-Hudaybi (also Hassan al Hodeiby) (Arabic: حسن الهضيبي) (December 1891 – 11 November 1973) was the second "General Guide", or leader, of the Muslim Brotherhood organization, appointed in 1951 after founder Hassan al-Banna's assassination two years earlier. Al-Hudaybi held the position until his death in 1973.

== Early life ==
Hassan Isma‘il al-Hudaybi was born in the village of Arab al-Suwaliha, located in north-east Cairo, in December 1891. The eldest of four sisters and three brothers, he was raised in a poor, working-class family. His father wanted his eldest son to become a scholar and thus began Hassan's education with Qur'an lessons at the local village school. However, after a year of religious schooling, Hassan chose to transfer to a secular government primary school. He continued his secular education through secondary school and later received a degree in law in 1915.

In 1924, al-Hudaybi was promoted to judgeship and received his first posting at Qena, but gradually worked his way up the judicial system. By the 1940s, he was one of the highest ranking representatives of the Egyptian judiciary, with his final post being Chancellor of the Court of Appeals before leading the Muslim Brotherhood.

== Appointment as General Guide ==
Al-Hudaybi was aware of the society of the Muslim Brotherhood beginning in the 1930s, and was introduced to Hasan al-Banna approximately ten years later. His friendship with al-Banna grew and he began to serve as an unofficial personal advisor to him. Through this secretive relationship, al-Hudaybi gradually learned about the internal affairs of the Brotherhood.

Following the dissolution of the society in 1948 and the assassination of al-Banna in 1949, the survival of the Muslim Brotherhood was at stake. If the Muslim Brotherhood wanted to continue as a political-religious movement instead of maintaining its reputation as a violent elite, they needed to improve their public image. Given that the leading members of the society were all shrouded by the stigma of violence and crisis, the leaders appointed al-Hudaybi as the new Murshid, or guide. Al-Hudaybi was a strategic choice by the Brotherhood. With his strong ties to political power, aversion to violence, and clean public image, al-Hudaybi was seen as an outsider whose image could help the Muslim Brotherhood regain legitimacy.

However, although al-Hudaybi was appointed as the leader of the society, his role was initially intended to only be a symbolic one. Many of his demands were initially disregarded, including requests to appoint his supporters to key administrative positions as well as calls to dissolve of the Secret Apparatus of the Brotherhood.

With the abrogation of the 1936 Anglo-Egyptian treaty by the Wafdist government led by Mustafa Al Nahhas and the outbreak of the Suez Emergency, the Muslim Brotherhood’s Ismailia branch under the leadership of Al Hudaybi declared a jihad in Britain and sent volunteers to participate in the conflict against British troops in the Suez Canal Zone.

== Conflict with the Secret Apparatus ==
Once al-Hudaybi entered office, he condemned the violence that engrossed the movement from 1946–1949 and ordered that the Brotherhood dissolve their secret military branch immediately. This created deep tensions between him and other high-ranking members supportive of the Secret Apparatus, including Salih al-’Ashmawi and Abd al-Rahman al-Sanadi. Throughout his leadership, al-Hudaybi continued to oppose violent action and repudiated any preparations for armed conflicts by the Brotherhood. Members of the Secret Apparatus who considered themselves fighters in a noble cause felt alienated by him and soon joined ranks to try to force al-Hudaybi to resign.

== Imprisonment ==
After a former member of the Secret Unit, Mahmud ‘Abd al-Latif, allegedly attempted to assassinate President ‘Abd al-Nasir in October of 1954, the government began a new wave of arrests against members of the Muslim Brotherhood. On December 4th, seven defendants of the Brotherhood, including Hassan al-Hudaybi, were condemned to death by the court. Three days later, the death sentences were carried out except that of al-Hudaybi's, whose verdict was commuted to life in prison.

== Preachers, Not Judges (Du'at la Qudat) ==
While in prison, al-Hudaybi is said to have completed the manuscript for Du'at la Qudat, which was published in 1977, after his death. Emmanuel Sivan and Gilles Kepel have argued that the text is a refutation of Sayyid Qutb's Islamist manifesto Ma'alim fi al-Tariq (Milestones Along the Way). Although Du'at la Qudat does not mention Qutb by name and only criticizes Pakistani Islamist Abul A'la Maududi, it argues against takfir – the practice of declaring another Muslim a non-believer – that Qutb employed. Scholar Barbara Zollner suggests that Qutb is not a direct target of the text, but rather that al-Hudaybi wanted to respond to a radical marginal group of the Brotherhood.

One of the main objectives of the text is to define Muslims and kafirs, or unbelievers. Qutb had previously argued that so-called Muslim governments were actually non-Islamic jahiliyyah that must be abolished by "physical power and Jihad." According to al-Hudaybi, however, the committing of a sin that requires punishment does not make the sinner an apostate. Judgement over Muslims should be left to God alone.

Al-Hudaybi disagrees with Qutb, believing that Shahada, or profession of the belief in Islam alone is sufficient to be a Muslim.

== Death ==
Hassan al-Hudaybi died while under house arrest on November 11, 1973. Al-Hudaybi was succeeded by Umar al-Tilmisani. Years later, Hudaybi's son, Ma'mun al-Hudaybi, briefly headed the Brotherhood from 2002 until his death in 2004.

Religious titles
| Preceded by Hassan al-Banna | General Guide of the Muslim Brotherhood; 1951–1973 | Succeeded by Umar al-Tilmisani |
