= Hassan al-Banna =

Egyptian Islamist leader and politician (1906–1949)

Sheikh Hassan al-Banna
- حسن أحمد عبد الرحمن محمد البنا
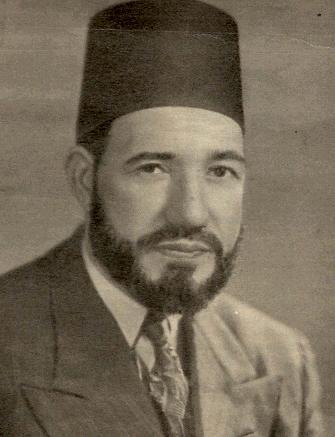

Personal life
- Born: Hassan Ahmed Abd al-Rahman Muhammed al-Banna; 14 October 1906 Mahmoudiyah, Beheira, Khedivate of Egypt
- Died: 12 February 1949 (aged 42) Cairo, Kingdom of Egypt
- Cause of death: Gunshot wounds
- Political party: Muslim Brotherhood

Religious life
- Religion: Islam
- Jurisprudence: Independent (Salafi)
- Creed: Athari
- Movement: Ikhwani

Muslim leader
- Influenced by: Ahmad Bin Hanbal, al-Ghazali, Ibn Taymiyyah, Ibn Qayyim al-Jawziyah, Ahmed al-Banna, Abdul-Wahhab al-Hasafi, Muhammad Abduh, Rashid Rida, Shaykh Izz al-Din al-Qassam
- Influenced: Muslim Brotherhood, Jamaat-e-Islami, Hassan al-Hudaybi, Mohammed Mahdi Akef, Mohammed Badie, Mahmoud Ezzat, Mohamed Naguib, Gamal Abdel Nasser, Anwar Sadat, Sayyid Qutb, Muhammad Mahmoud al-Sawaf, Abdel Moneim Saleh al-Ali al-Ezzi, Yusuf Azm, Mohammed al-Ghazali, Taqi al-Din al-Nabhani, Abdul Hamid al-Bilali, Wagdy Abd el-Hamied Mohamed Ghoneim, Abu Muhammad al-Maqdisi, Amin al-Husseini, Abdel Aziz al-Rantisi, Yahya Ayyash, Yusuf al-Qaradawi, Rached Ghannouchi, Abdullah al-Mutawa, Jassim Muhalhal al-Yasin, Muhammad Surur, Mustafa al-Siba'i, Mohamed al-Awadi, Abdullah Yusuf Azzam, Mahfoud Nahnah, Zainab al-Ghazali, Labiba Ahmed, Yvonne Ridley

Founder and 1st General Guide of the Egyptian Muslim Brotherhood
- In office 22 March 1928 – 12 February 1949
- Succeeded by: Hassan al-Hudaybi

Hassan Ahmed Abd al-Rahman Muhammed al-Banna (Arabic: حسن أحمد عبد الرحمن محمد البنا; 14 October 1906 – 12 February 1949), known as Hassan al-Banna (Arabic: حسن البنا), was an Egyptian schoolteacher and imam, best known for founding the Muslim Brotherhood, one of the largest and most influential global Islamist movements, and for his death at the hands of the Egyptian government.

Al-Banna's writings marked a turning-point in Islamic intellectual history by presenting a distinct and all-encompassing modern ideology based on Islam. Al-Banna considered Islam to be a comprehensive system of life, with the Quran and Sunnah as the only acceptable constitution. He called for Islamization of the state, the economy, and society. He declared that establishing a just society required development of institutions and progressive taxation, and developed an Islamic fiscal theory where zakat would be reserved for social expenditure in order to reduce inequality. Al-Banna's ideology featured criticism of Western materialism, British imperialism, and the traditionalism of the Egyptian ulema. He appealed to Egyptian and pan-Arab patriotism but rejected Arab nationalism and regarded all Muslims as members of a single nation-community.

Following the abolition of the Caliphate in 1924, al-Banna called on Muslims to prepare for armed struggle against colonial rule; he warned Muslims against the "widespread belief" that "jihad of the heart" was more important than "jihad of the sword". He allowed the formation of a secret military wing within the Muslim Brotherhood, which took part in the Arab–Israeli conflict. Al-Banna generally encouraged Egyptians to abandon Western customs; and argued that the state should enforce Islamic public morality through censorship and application of hudud corporal punishment. Nonetheless, his thought was open to Western ideas and some of his writings quote European authors instead of Islamic sources.

Al-Banna was assassinated by the Egyptian secret police in 1949. His son-in-law Said Ramadan emerged as a major leader of the Muslim Brotherhood in the 1950s.

== Early life ==
Hassan al-Banna was born on 14 October 1906 in Mahmudiyya, a rural Nile Delta town in the Beheira Governorate northwest of Cairo.

His father, Sheikh Ahmed Abd al-Rahman al-Banna al-Sa'ati, was a Hanbali imam, muezzin and mosque teacher. His father was an important spiritual influence during al-Banna's early life. Sheikh Ahmed was known for his work as a Hanbali scholar, particularly his classifications of the traditions of Imam Ahmad ibn Hanbal. These classifications became known as musnad al-fath al-rabbani. Through this work, Sheikh Ahmed forged connections with Islamic scholars that proved useful when his son moved to Cairo in 1932.

In addition to his early exposure to puritanism, Hassan al-Banna was inspired by Rashid Rida's magazine, Al-Manar and he was heavily influenced by Islamic fundamentalism as a youth in Mahmudiyya.

Al-Banna was first exposed to Egyptian nationalist politics during the Egyptian Revolution of 1919; he was thirteen years old at the time. In his personal accounts, Al-Banna identified himself with the widespread activism of the time. Despite his young age, al-Banna participated in demonstrations in Damanhur, published political pamphlets and founded youth reform societies. Although Al-Banna's family were not members of the Egyptian elite, they were relatively well-respected in Mahmudiyya. Sheikh Ahmed was a distinguished imam and the family owned some property. However, during the 1920s economic crisis, the family had trouble sustaining the upkeep of their property and moved to Cairo in 1924.

== Education ==
In Mahmudiyya, al-Banna studied in the village mosque with Sheikh Zahran. The two developed a close relationship that influenced al-Banna's early intellectual and religious development. In addition to the mosque school, al-Banna received private instruction from his father. He also studied in Cairo for four years; he attended Dar al-‘Ulum, an Egyptian institution that educated prospective teachers in modern subjects. The school was not very traditional and al-Banna enrolled against his father's wishes, as a break from typical Islamic conservatism. Building upon his father's scholarly connections, al-Banna became associated with the Islamic Society for Nobility of Islamic Morals and the Young Men's Muslim Association (YMMA). He published more than fifteen articles in Majallat al-Fath, an influential Islamic journal associated with the YMMA.

Hasan al-Banna headed to Cairo in 1923 to enroll as a student in Dar al-Ulum College. His student life would be a significant experience for his ideological formation. In the face of an urban social life vastly different from his rural upbringing, Al-Banna "noticed a defection of the educated youth from what he considered to be the Islamic way of life." Al-Banna also had disdain for Egypt's liberal political class. It was during this time that he became exposed to the works of the Salafi scholar Rashid Rida. He was a regular visitor of the Salafiyya book store, at that time directed by Muhibb al-Din al-Khatib; and often attended the lectures of Rashid Rida. For Al-Banna, Rida's works provided him theological guidance to rectify the faults he was witnessing in Egypt.

== Muslim Brotherhood ==
Al-Banna learned of the abolition of the Ottoman Caliphate in 1924, while he was still a student. This event influenced him greatly; although the caliphate had no power, he viewed its end as a "calamity". He later called the events a "declaration of war against all shapes of Islam".

After completing his studies at a Dar al-‘Ulum in 1927, al-Banna became a primary school teacher in Ismailia. At that time, Ismailia was the location of the Egyptian headquarters of the Suez Canal. Foreign influence was stronger in Ismailia than in other parts of Egypt. While living there, al-Banna grew increasingly disillusioned with British cultural colonialism. He was especially concerned that hasty attempts to modernize Egypt often had the negative effect of compromising Islamic principles. Many Egyptian nationalists were also dissatisfied with Wafd leadership, mainly because of its moderate stances and insistence on secularism.

Hassan al-Banna became acquainted with many important thinkers in Cairo, and had also established personal correspondence with Rashid Rida. Here, Al-Banna developed an ideological framework which synthesised the worldview of past Islamic revivalists in Rashid Rida's interpretation. One of the most important revivalist ideas advocated by Rida was the formation of an Islamic state that would govern by the Sharia and return to a society modelled during the time of Prophet Muhammad and his companions. This idea of a revolutionary struggle based on Islamic principles would guide Hassan al-Banna's later life and manifest in the formation of the Muslim Brotherhood.

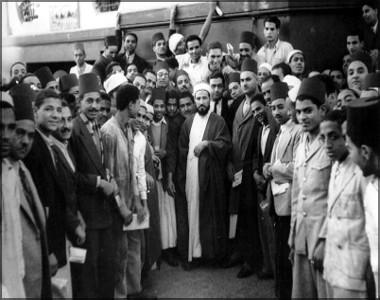
Hassan al-Banna with his followers and supporters.

Following the ideas of Rashid Rida, Al-Banna believed that moral decay was the primary cause of societal and political decline and felt that talks held within the arena of mosques were not sufficient to hold the influx of societal liberalisation encouraged by political secularisation. In his time at Ismailia, Al-Banna took to the cafes to preach to the general public in short lectures. His charismatic speeches attracted a large number of youth to his call. In March 1928 six workers affiliated with the Suez Canal Company approached Banna, complaining about injustices suffered by Muslims at the hands of foreign colonialist control. They appointed Banna as their leader and to work for Islam through Jihad and revive Islamic Brotherhood. Thus, the Muslim Brothers were born; under the pledge that its members would

"be soldiers in the call to Islam, and in that is the life for the country and the honour for the Ummah. ... We are brothers in the service of Islam. Hence we are the 'Muslim Brothers'."

At first, the Muslim Brotherhood was only one of many small Islamic associations that existed at the time. Similar to the organizations that al-Banna had himself joined at a young age, these organizations aimed to promote personal piety and engaged in pure charitable activities. By the late 1930s, the Muslim Brotherhood had established branches in every Egyptian province.

A decade later, the organization had 500,000 active members and as many sympathizers in Egypt alone. Its appeal was not limited only to Egypt; its popularity had grown in several other countries. The organization's growth was particularly pronounced after al-Banna relocated their headquarters to Cairo in 1932. The most important factor contributing to this dramatic expansion was the organizational and ideological leadership provided by al-Banna.

In Ismailia, al-Banna preached not only in the mosque, but also in the coffee houses; in those times, coffee houses were generally viewed as a morally suspect novelty. When some of his views on relatively minor points of Islamic practice led to strong disagreements with the local religious elite, he adopted the policy of avoiding religious controversies.

Al-Banna was appalled by the many conspicuous signs of foreign military and economic domination in Ismailia: the British military camps, the public utilities, farms, food supply were owned by foreign interests, and the comfortable villas of the foreign management of the Suez Canal Company, next to the simple shacks of the Egyptian workers.

== Political activity and thought ==
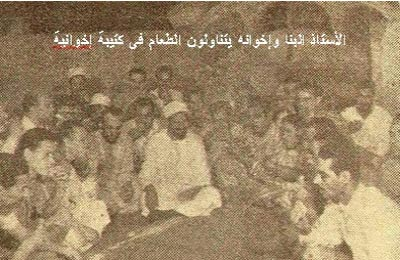
Hassan al-Banna eating with supporters.

Al-Banna endeavored to bring about reforms through institution-building, relentless activism at the grassroots level and a reliance on mass communication. He built a complex mass movement that featured sophisticated governance structures; sections in charge of furthering the society's values among peasants, workers and professionals; units entrusted with key functions, including propagation of the message, liaison with the Islamic world and press and translation; and specialized committees for finances and legal affairs. Declaring Islam as the only comprehensive religious system that could solve the challenges of modernity and calling upon Muslims to reject Western ideologies, Al-Banna wrote:

"If the French Revolution decreed the rights of man and declared for freedom, equality and brotherhood, and if the Russian Revolution brought closer the classes and social justice for the people, the great Islamic Revolution [had] decreed all that 1300 years before. It did not confine itself to philosophical theories but rather spread these principles through daily life, and added to them [the notions of] divinity of mankind, and the perfectibility of his virtues and [the fulfilment of] his spiritual tendencies".

Al-Banna relied on pre-existing social networks―in particular those built around mosques, Islamic welfare associations and neighborhood groups―to anchor the Muslim Brotherhood into Egyptian society. This weaving of traditional ties into a distinctively modern structure was at the root of his success. Directly attached to the brotherhood, and feeding its expansion, were numerous businesses, clinics, and schools. In addition, members were affiliated with the movement through a series of cells, revealingly called usar ("families").

The material, social and psychological support provided by the Muslim Brotherhood were instrumental to the movement's ability to generate enormous loyalty among its members and to attract new recruits. The movement was built around services and an organizational structure intended to enable individuals to integrate into a distinctly Islamic setting that was shaped by the society's own principles.

Rooted in Islam, Al-Banna's message tackled issues including colonialism, public health, educational policy, natural resources management, social inequalities, pan-Islamism, nationalism, Arab nationalism, the weakness of the Islamic world on the international scene, and the growing conflict in Palestine. By emphasizing concerns that appealed to a variety of constituencies, al-Banna was able to recruit from among a cross-section of Egyptian society—though modern-educated civil servants, office employees, and professionals remained dominant among the organization's activists and decision-makers. Al-Banna was also active in resisting British colonial rule in Egypt.

Al-Banna warned his readers against the "widespread belief among many Muslims" that jihad of the heart was more important and demanding than jihad of the sword. He called on Muslims to prepare for jihad against colonial powers:

Muslims ... are compelled to humble themselves before non-Muslims, and are ruled by unbelievers. Their lands have been trampled over, and their honor besmirched. Their adversaries are in charge of their affairs, and the rites of their religion have fallen into abeyance with their own domains ... Hence it has become an individual obligation, which there is no evading, on every Muslim to prepare his equipment, to make up his mind to engage in jihad, and to get ready for it until the opportunity is ripe and God decrees.

With his work On Jihad written toward the end of the 1930s, he became "the first influential scholar since the 1857 India uprising" to call for jihad against unbelievers.

=== Views ===
Al-Banna was well known for his emphasis on importance of propagating Islam and on jihad of the sword in the face of Western power.

The Quran has appointed the Muslims guardians over immature humanity and gave them dominion and sovereignty over the world to serve this noble purpose. Our mission is to guide all humanity towards the pure Islamic principles without which man cannot attain happiness. God has also commanded us to spread Islam by reason and persuasion, but if we are opposed, then by the sword and the spear.

He also believed that the doctrine of early Muslims towards disbelievers in the creation of their empire had not been outdated. "Islam presents hostile [Christians and Jews] with three choices: Acceptance of Islam, war, or paying the poll tax" (jizya). Although neither a ruler nor a scholar, in the history of the Islamic world Al-Banna notable for inspiring individual Muslims to wage "free-lance" jihad warfare "for the first time"—as prior to his influence jihad had been led a caliph or Muslim ruler.

== Muslim Brothers and the Palestine conflict ==
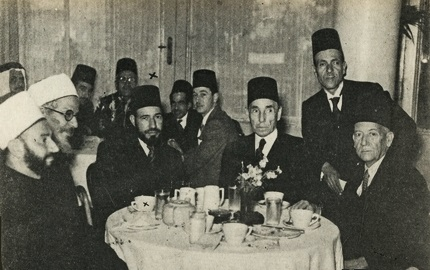
Al-Banna (third from left) with Aziz Ali al-Misri (fourth from right), Mohamed Ali Eltaher (second from the right) and Egyptian, Palestinian and Algerian political and religious figures at a reception in Cairo, 1947

Among the Muslim Brothers' most notable accomplishments during these early years was its involvement in the 1936–1939 Arab revolt in Palestine. The Muslim Brothers launched a pro-Palestine campaign which contributed to making the Palestine issue a widespread Muslim concern. The Muslim Brothers carried out a fundraising campaign said to have relied upon donations from the rural and urban working classes, rather than wealthy Egyptians. In addition to their fundraising efforts, the Muslim Brothers also organized special prayers for Palestinian Arab nationalists, held political rallies, and distributed propaganda. Although the Arab revolt in Palestine was ultimately suppressed through repression and military action, the Muslim Brothers' impressive mobilization efforts helped make the Palestinian question a pan-Arab concern in the Middle East.

When Rashid Rida died in August 1935, his Al-Manar magazine also perished with him. Sometime in 1939, Hassan al-Banna resurrected Al-Manar to further promote the revolutionary ideology pioneered by the Muslim Brotherhood and claim Rashid Rida's legacy.

Hassan al-Banna in two of his writings, Peace In Islam and Our Message, criticizes the ultra-nationalism of Nazi Germany and Fascist Italy as being a "reprehensible idea" within which was "not the slightest good" and which gave power to "chosen tyrants". According to historian Malise Ruthven, he expressed `considerable admiration for the Nazi Brownshirts` during the 1930s. He used the name kata'ib (phalanges) for the units of his organization, in the style of Francisco Franco, the Fascist dictator of Spain (according to Paul Berman).

=== Final days and assassination ===
Between 1948 and 1949, shortly after the society sent volunteers to fight against Israel in the 1948 Arab–Israeli War, the conflict between the monarchy and the organization reached its climax. Concerned with the Brotherhood's increasing assertiveness and popularity among the masses, as well as being alarmed by rumours that the Brotherhood was plotting a coup against the monarchy and cabinet, Prime Minister Nokrashy Pasha (whose predecessor had been slain by a Brotherhood adherent near the end of World War II) outlawed the organization in December 1948. The Brotherhood's assets were impounded and scores of its members were sent to jail. Following the murder of Nokrashy Pasha by a student member of the Brotherhood, Al-Banna released a statement condemning the assassination and stating that terror is not acceptable in Islam.

On 12 February 1949, al-Banna and his brother-in-law Abdul Karim Mansur were scheduled to negotiate with the government's representative, Minister Zaki Ali Pasha, at the Jama'iyyat al-Shubban al-Muslimeen headquarters in Cairo—but the minister never arrived. By 5 p.m., al-Banna and his brother-in-law had decided to leave. As they stood waiting for a taxi, they were shot by two men. Al-Banna eventually died from his wounds. King Farouk and his Iron Guard of Egypt were accused of being behind the assassination. His father Ahmed retrieved his corpse from Qasr El Eyni Hospital to his house, then his coffin was carried by women with the police escort who prevented men from attending his funeral except for Makram Ebeid who was a government figure.

== Family ==
Al-Banna's daughter Wafa al-Banna was married to Said Ramadan, who became a major leader of the Muslim Brotherhood. Their two sons, Tariq Ramadan and Hani Ramadan, are Islamic scholars and educationists. Hassan al-Banna's younger brother, Gamal al-Banna, was a more liberal scholar and proponent of Islamic reform.

== Writings ==
Hassan al-Banna wrote more than 2000 articles and many books, which include an autobiographical novel entitled Mudhakkirât al-da'wa wa al-dâ'iya (Remembrances of Preaching and of a Preacher).

== See also ==
- History of the Muslim Brotherhood in Egypt

== Notes ==
Religious titles
Preceded by New position	General Guide of the Muslim Brotherhood; 1928–1949	Succeeded by Hassan al-Hudaybi
