= Scorpion Prison =

Prison in Egypt

The Al-Aqrab Prison (Arabic: سجن العقرب, romanized: Sign al-ʿAqrab, lit. 'The Scorpion Prison'; official name Tora Prison 992 Maximum-Security) was a supermax prison in Helwan, Egypt, south of Cairo. It was used for political prisoners and opponents of the Egyptian government, which included Muslim Brotherhood and April 6 Youth Movement leaders, as well as political activists. Inmates allegedly suffered from ill-treatment and shortages of food. The prison became known during the rule of Hosni Mubarak.

The prison was emptied in 2022 and later demolished.

== Prison site ==
Scorpion Prison was located two kilometers from the gate of the official Tora Prison area, but its position as a high security prison, and like the last of the cluster in the famous Tora chain, made its location, even though it was at the back of the prisons, distinctive as it was surrounded by a wall of seven meters high. The gates were armored from the inside and the outside, and the officers' offices were completely behind iron bars and barriers.

== History ==
The idea of a series of high-security prisons was proposed by a group of officers upon their return from a training mission in the United States, and the Ministry of Interior considered it a creative and sufficient idea to fill what it considered a deficiency in its policy with armed groups in particular. In 1991, former Interior Minister Hassan al-Alfi and a group of his assistants-among them Major General Habib el-Adly, who was Assistant Minister for State Security Affairs at the time - began preparing these American ideas and placing them on the priority of immediate implementation.

In the same year, Tora high-security prison (known thereafter - among the detainees - Scorpion Prison) began to be constructed and took two years to build, completing on May 30, 1993. As early as 1995, the prison served as a CIA rendition site under the Mubarak regime.

== Prison building ==
The prison consisted of 320 cells that housed approximately 2,000 inmates. divided into 4 horizontal wards that take the shape of the letter H, each cell with a lamp of 100 watt power controlled by the fluctuations of the penal policy in the prison administration, so that the administration could cut off the water and lighting and close the windows as it deemed appropriate. On the other hand, the engineering drawing allocated an area of 25 meters by 15 meters in the shape of the letter L for the purpose of "occasional" exercise. In addition, 20 cells were used as disciplinary wards for political prisoners in which lighting and conversation were prohibited. On June 26, 1993, Al-Adly attended as Assistant Minister, who made sure that the new prison was successful in terms of its ability to keep detainees and interrogate them in various ways.

Each ward, in high security, was completely separated from the rest of the prison, once its armored outer gate was closed, so the detainees were not even able to communicate through cells, as prisoners do in regular prisons, as a result of the huge quantities of reinforced concrete that prevent sound from travelling.

Speaking of al-Aqrab, Colonel Omar Afifi stated:

Al-Aqrab prison was designed so that the sunlight never enters any of its cells during the day. As a result, inmates develop diseases due to the lack of vitamin D, whose scarcity leads to weakness in the mind and in the body. The prison also suffers from lack of ventilation. During summer, temperatures within it rise to unbearable levels, while in winter it turns into a freezer.

== Notable inmates ==
- Sayyed Imam Al-Sharif (2004–)
- † Mohamed Morsi (2013–2019), deposed President of Egypt, who died in prison of a heart attack.
- † Essam el-Erian (2013–2020), vice chairman of the Freedom and Justice Party, who died in prison of a heart attack.
- Essam El-Haddad (2013–)
- Husam Abu al-Bukhari (2013–)
- Gehad El-Haddad (2014–)
- Mohamed Fahmy (2014–2015)
- Khaled al-Qazzaz (2014–2015)
- † Hamdi Hassan (2013–2021)
