= Hamdi Hassan =

Egyptian politician (1956–2021)

Member of the House of Representatives of Egypt
- In office 2005–2010

Personal details
- Born: 12 August 1956 Alexandria, Republic of Egypt
- Died: 25 November 2021 (aged 65) Scorpion Prison, Helwan, Egypt
- Party: Muslim Brotherhood in Egypt

Hamdi Hassan (Egyptian Arabic: حمدى حسن; 12 August 1956 – 25 November 2021) was an Egyptian politician. A member of the Muslim Brotherhood in Egypt, he served in the House of Representatives from 2005 to 2010.
