= Muhammad Hamid Abu al-Nasr =

Fourth General Guide of the Egyptian Muslim Brotherhood

Muhammad Hamid Abu al-Nasr محمد حامد أبو النصر

4th General Guide of the Egyptian Muslim Brotherhood
- In office 22 May 1986 – 20 January 1996
- Preceded by: Umar al-Tilmisani
- Succeeded by: Mustafa Mashhur

Personal details
- Born: 25 March 1913 Manfalut, Egypt
- Died: 20 January 1996 (aged 82) Cairo, Egypt
- Party: Muslim Brotherhood

Muhammad Hamid Abu al-Nasr (Arabic: محمد حامد أبو النصر; 25 March 1913 – 20 January 1996) was the fourth General Guide (Murshid al-'am) of the Egyptian Muslim Brotherhood. A controversial choice to lead the group after the 1986 death of longtime General Guide 'Umar al-Tilmisani, al-Nasr was opposed by a large faction backing other candidates such as Salah Shadi or Husayn Kamal al-Din, but was installed as Murshid by Mustafa Mashhur, who succeeded him soon after. His written book is "Wadi e Neel Ka Qafila Sakht Jaan".

Religious titles
Preceded by Umar al-Tilmisani	General Guide of the Muslim Brotherhood; 1986–1996	Succeeded by Mustafa Mashhur
