= Mustafa Mashhur =

Fifth General Guide of the Egyptian Muslim Brotherhood

Mustafa Mashhur مصطفى مشهور

5th General Guide of the Egyptian Muslim Brotherhood
- In office 20 January 1996 – 29 October 2002
- Preceded by: Muhammad Hamid Abu al-Nasr
- Succeeded by: Ma'mun al-Hudaybi

Personal details
- Born: 15 September 1921 Minya al-Qamh, Sharqia, Egypt
- Died: 29 October 2002 (aged 81) Cairo, Egypt

Mustafa Mashhur (Arabic: مصطفى مشهور; 15 September 1921 – 29 October 2002) was the fifth General Guide (leader) of the Egyptian Muslim Brotherhood. He was the official head of the Muslim Brotherhood organization from 1996 until 2002, although outside observers have suggested that he informally ran the organization during the ten-year term of his predecessor Muhammad Hamid Abu al-Nasr as well.

He published "Jihad Is The Way" in 1995, the last of a five-volume work titled "The Laws of Da’wa." Da'wa means to "summon" others to Islam, essentially a form of proselytizing to non-Muslims. The book detailed his views on how the Muslim Brotherhood determined to advance Islam's global conquest, to reestablish an Islamic Caliphate, and to infuse all Muslims with a sense of duty to wage jihad against Israel.

== Death ==
Mashhur died on 29 October 2002, and he was succeeded by Ma'mun al-Hudaybi, who was the son of Hassan al-Hudaybi, the second General Guide of the Muslim Brotherhood.

Religious titles
Preceded by Muhammad Hamid Abu al-Nasr	General Guide of the Muslim Brotherhood; 1996–2002	Succeeded by Ma'mun al-Hudaybi
