= Gehad El-Haddad =

Egyptian activist (born 1981)

Gehad El-Haddad (Arabic: جهاد الحداد; born c. 1981) is an Egyptian political activist for the Muslim Brotherhood in Egypt. He acted as media spokesman for the Brotherhood from May 2013 until he was arrested on 17 September 2013.

He became the most recognized face of the Muslim Brotherhood in foreign media during the period following former president Mohamed Morsi's ouster. He held several interviews with international media from inside Rabaa Square where protesters made a sit-in for more than a month.

== Early life ==
The son of Essam El-Haddad, a senior advisor for foreign relations for the Brotherhood, Gehad El-Haddad grew up in Alexandria. He worked for the Industrial Modernization Centre and then the Clinton Climate Initiative. While studying strategic marketing and filmmaking on a Chevening Scholarship at De Montfort University in the United Kingdom, he met Egyptian televangelist Amr Khaled and spent a year working on a television series with him called "Sunna al-Hayat" — "The Makers of Life."

== Political career ==
El-Haddad worked as a media strategist for Morsi's presidential campaign in 2011. He volunteered for the Muslim Brotherhood Renaissance Project, which started while Morsi was in office. He was arrested along with other Muslim Brotherhood leaders in 2007 and was released in March 2011. El-Haddad was again arrested in September 2013 as part of a military crackdown on Morsi's supporters following the 2013 Egyptian coup d'état, with officials citing "suspicion of incitement to violence".

In February 2017, as some reports emerged that the Trump administration was mulling designating the Muslim Brotherhood a foreign terrorist organisation, Gehad El-Haddad wrote an op-ed for The New York Times from his prison cell in Tora Prison in Cairo outlining that the Muslim Brotherhood was not a terrorist organisation but rather a peaceful socio-political organisation. Following its publication, he was moved to solitary confinement in Scorpion Prison.

While in prison, he went on hunger strike. On 25 October 2019, his brother Abdullah stated that Gehad had lost his ability to walk as a result of beatings and subsequent medical negligence.
