= Essam El-Haddad =

Egyptian politician (born 1953)

- عصام الحداد
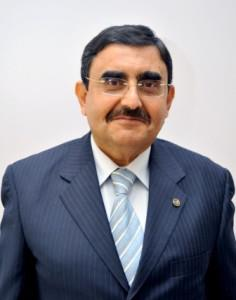
- Essam El-Haddad in 2012
- Born: 14 November 1953 (age 72); Alexandria, Egypt
- Occupation: Politician
- Organization: Muslim Brotherhood in Egypt
- Political party: Freedom and Justice Party
- Spouse: Mona Imam
- Children: Gehad; Abdullah; Others

Essam El-Haddad (Arabic: عصام الحداد, romanized: Isām al-Haddād; born 1953) is an Egyptian politician. He was a senior advisor for foreign relations for the Muslim Brotherhood in Egypt and the Freedom and Justice Party. In August 2012, he was appointed as one of four Egyptian Presidential assistants with responsibility for foreign relations and international cooperation until the overthrow of Egyptian president Mohamed Morsi on 3 July 2013. He is now in custody in solitary confinement in Al-Aqrab Prison in Cairo.

== Early life and career ==
Essam spent his early life in Alexandria in Egypt. He attended the faculty of medicine in Alexandria University where he earned BA degree. His political involvement began while he was a student when he was elected a president of the student union.

He had his M.B.A. from Aston University, England. He studied for PhD degree in University of Birmingham Medical School where he also worked as a research fellow, in addition to being Head of Egyptian Students’ Society in Birmingham and Head of Islamic Students’ Society in Birmingham University.

In 1984, El-Haddad co-founded Islamic Relief, an international humanitarian organisation working in more than 40 countries providing emergency aid, carrying out long-term development, and campaigning for change. The Islamic Relief international headquarters are in Digbeth, in Birmingham, UK.

In Egypt, he chaired the Arabian Group For Development (AGD), the company was a member of the Union of Arab Exhibitions, the International Business Forum, the German-Arab Chamber of Industry and Commerce, the British Egyptian Business Association, and the Canadian Chamber of Commerce. He also founded "Inter-Build Egypt," the country's largest exhibition for the construction sector.

He worked also as a management consultant in SKOPOS Company, one of the leading Management Consulting and Organization Development companies in Middle East based in Dubai, UAE. He is also a member of the board of governors (BOG) of the International Business forum (IBF) in Istanbul, and a frequent discussant and participant in Friends of Europe Think Tank (Development Forum) in Brussels.

== Family members ==
One of his sons is Gehad El-Haddad Senior Adviser and Media Spokesperson for the Muslim Brotherhood. Gehad had become the most recognized face of the Muslim Brotherhood in foreign media during the period following former President Mohamed Morsi's ouster. He held several interviews with international media from inside Rabaa Square where protesters made a sit-in for more than a month. He is now also in Al-Akrab prison in solitary confinement.

== Morsi Administration ==
El-Haddad was appointed as Assistant to President Mohamed Morsi for Foreign Relations and International Cooperation in August 2012. He was leading the country's efforts to join the BRICS, and engineered the Egyptian Initiative to end the Syrian Crisis. He also contributed to the cease-fire between Gaza and Israel in 2012.

On 30 June 2013, after a year of Morsi presidency, millions of protesters across Egypt took to the streets and demanded the resignation of Mohamed Morsi. After 3 days, General Abdel Fattah el-Sisi the chief of the Egyptian Armed Forces launched the 2013 Egyptian coup d'état overthrowing president Mohamed Morsi.

Before General Sisi made his statement. El-Haddad took to the official Facebook account to post a frightening statement as described by media at that time. The following are parts of it.

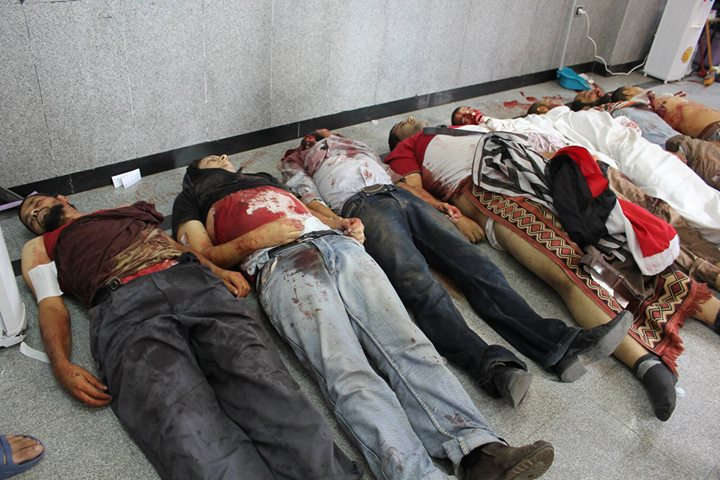
Dead bodies in Rabaa massacre

As I write these lines I am fully aware that these may be the last lines I get to post on this page. For the sake of Egypt and for historical accuracy, let’s call what is happening by its real name: Military coup.

...

On January 25 I stood in Tahrir square. My children stood in protest in Cairo and Alexandria. We stood ready to sacrifice for this revolution. When we did that, we did not support a revolution of elites. And we did not support a conditional democracy. We stood, and we still stand, for a very simple idea: given freedom, we Egyptians can build institutions that allow us to promote and choose among all the different visions for the country. We quickly discovered that almost none of the other actors were willing to extend that idea to include us.

...

There are still people in Egypt who believe in their right to make a democratic choice. Hundreds of thousands of them have gathered in support of democracy and the Presidency. And they will not leave in the face of this attack. To move them, there will have to be violence. It will either come from the army, the police, or the hired mercenaries. Either way there will be considerable bloodshed. And the message will resonate throughout the Muslim World loud and clear: democracy is not for Muslims.

...

I do not need to explain in detail the worldwide catastrophic ramifications of this message. In the last week there has been every attempt to issue a counter narrative that this is just scaremongering and that the crushing of Egypt’s nascent democracy can be managed. We no longer have the time to engage in frivolous academic back and forth. The audience that reads this page understands the price that the world continues to pay for the wars in Afghanistan and Iraq. Egypt is neither Afghanistan nor Iraq. Its symbolic weight and resulting impact is far more significant.

...

Many have seen fit in these last months to lecture us on how democracy is more than just the ballot box. That may indeed be true. But what is definitely true is that there is no democracy without the ballot box.

Two months later, troops loyal to Sisi began a bloody crackdown against protestors and dissidents–later to be dubbed the August 2013 Rabaa massacre–that left 1,400 dead and 16,000 detained.

== Under arrest ==
After Morsi and a number of his aides were taken to an unknown location by the country's armed forces. El-Haddad remained for months in this location without official charges until he was moved in 21 Dec 2013 to Al-Akrab prison.

In September 2013 Gehad El-Haddad was arrested in a Nasr City apartment. He is now in the same prison with his father but in different wings where they can't see or contact each other as said by his family.

Al-Aqrab (Scorpion) Prison in Tora is a notorious maximum-security facility used for political prisoners, who include Muslim Brotherhood and April 6 Youth Movement leaders, as well as political activists. The inmates in this prison suffer from ill-treated, shortage of food and extremely bad conditions for family visits. Essam and his son Gehad are in solitary confinement where they are allowed only one hour of exercise each day inside a closed yard.

Colonel Omar Afifi talking about Al-Aqrab stated:

Al-Aqrab prison was designed so that the sunlight never enters any of its cells during the day. As a result inmates develop other diseases due to the lack of vitamin D whose scarcity leads to weakness in the mind and in the body. The prison also suffers from lack of ventilation. During summer temperature within it rises to unbearable levels while in winter it turns into a freezer.

Essam is still on trial for more than 3 years without conviction till now. Human rights organization consider the political trials in Egypt to lack justice. The director of Amnesty International in Germany, Selmin Çalışkan, has said "Mass trial of opposition figures are grossly unfair and make justice more selective" She added "The Egyptian judiciary has become an instrument for the suppression of the opposition and the free press. At least 20 journalists are currently in prison because they have criticized the government in their coverage or uncovered human rights violations."

== Hunger strike ==
In February 2016, Essam El-Haddad objected when prison officials broke into his cell and insulted him. In response to his protests, officials deprived him from his right to get outside his solitary cell to the prison yard for a week. El-Haddad declared, "I am 63 and close to death but I will die with dignity." He was threatened by prison officials that his health won't bear such strike but he insisted and a day later prison officials retreated.

In the meanwhile, Al-Akrab banned family visits to prisoners from January 24 to February 10, 2016. When visits were resumed, only 30 families were allowed to visit a day in a prison that hosts more than 1,000 detainees. As a result, families had to sleep in the street outside the prison gate the night before their visits to make sure they will be allowed to visit their detainees next day. On February 14, prison guards assaulted the families who refused to leave after being denied the right to see their relatives. Four women were beaten and briefly arrested, and many fell to the ground after being violently pushed by the guards.

Several inmates including Gehad El-Haddad, went on strike against ill-treatment and the humiliating conditions of family visits. Under the slogan "I am human," the prisoners have set forth four main demands:

- Weekly hour-long family visits with no glass barrier
- Improving the quality and quantity of food and water to "fit human consumption"
- Allowing packages into the prison
- Allowing inmates outside on a daily basis

All of the above rights were in fact already supposed to be guaranteed by the prison.

Meanwhile, Families of Aqrab Detainees Association made a statement: "Major General Hassan Al-Sohagi, Assistant Minister of Interior for the prison sector, met with Aqrab Prison hunger-strikers and gave them a short message: he has "a Carte Blanche to deal with this strike" in whatever way he liked, from harassing detainees' families, through the prevention of visits, to state-sponsored executions, if this strike is not ended. Detainees rejected the junta regime's threat."

It is not clear what was the result of this hunger strike, but inmates of Al-Aqrab still suffer from ill-conditions while their trials are closing to its end.
