= Ma'mun al-Hudaybi =

Sixth General Guide of the Egyptian Muslim Brotherhood

Ma'mun al-Hudaybi مأمون الهضيبي

6th General Guide of the Muslim Brotherhood in Egypt
- In office 29 October 2002 – 8 January 2004
- Preceded by: Mustafa Mashhur
- Succeeded by: Mohammed Mahdi Akef

Personal details
- Born: May 28, 1921 Sohag, Egypt
- Died: January 8, 2004 (aged 82) Cairo, Egypt
- Parent: Hassan al-Hudaybi (father)
- Education: Cairo University

Ma'mun al-Hudaybi (Arabic: مأمون الهضيبي) (May 28, 1921–January 8, 2004) was the sixth General Guide of the Muslim Brotherhood in Egypt. He briefly succeeded Mustafa Mashhur as General Guide in 2002, and headed the Islamist group until his death on January 8, 2004. His successor was Mohammed Mahdi Akef. Ma'mun al-Hudaybi was the son of the second General Guide, Hassan al-Hudaybi.

== Early life and education ==
He was born in Sohag, in Upper Egypt on May 28, 1921. His family was originally from ‘Arab al-Sawalha in Qalyubiyya, but moved wherever his father's work as a judge for the justice ministry took them. He received a public education before graduating from the King Fouad University College of Law.

== Political views ==
Hudaybi is an important figure in Egyptian Islamist politics. In terms of internal political organization, he is reported by historian Fawaz Gerges as believing that "members must show obedience to the senior leadership."

Religious titles
Preceded by Mustafa Mashhur	General Guide of the Muslim Brotherhood; 2002–2004	Succeeded by Mohammed Mahdi Akef
