= Khaled al-Qazzaz =

Human rights activist

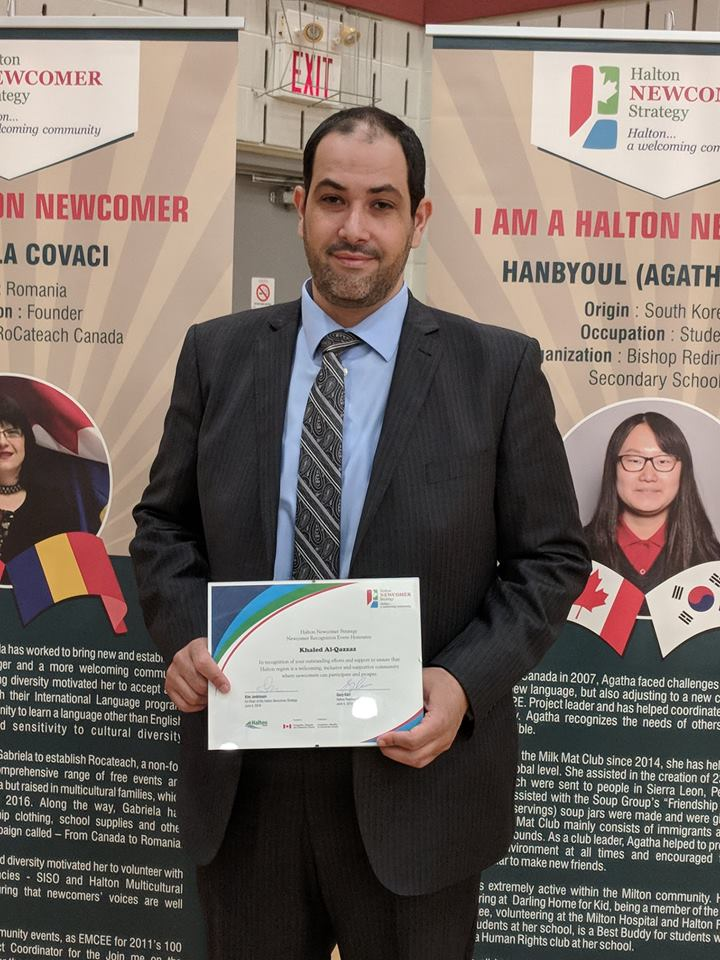

Khaled Al-Qazzaz (Egyptian Arabic: خالد القزاز; pronounced ['xæleːd æl qɑ'zæːz]) (born July 3, 1979) is an educator, philanthropist, and human rights activist based in Egypt and Canada. Al-Qazzaz graduated from the University of Toronto with a master's degree in mechanical engineering in 2003.

Al-Qazzaz was an aide to Egyptian president Mohamed Morsi. He was forcibly detained by the Egyptian military on July 3, 2013, along with the president and eight other government aides during the Egyptian coup d’état. Al-Qazzaz remained in an unknown military location for five and a half months. During this time, the Egyptian regime refused to acknowledge that it was holding Al-Qazzaz or to confirm his whereabouts, putting him outside the protection of the law. Eventually, Al-Qazzaz was transferred to Tora Prison (Scorpion Wing) on December 17, 2014, and held in solitary confinement for nine months. On October 26, 2014, Al-Qazzaz continued his detention in a private hospital for three months due to injuries sustained as a result of his confinement. As a result of efforts spearheaded by his Canadian wife Sarah Attia with the Free Khaled Al-Qazzaz Campaign, Al-Qazzaz was released on January 11, 2015. Despite his release and cleared legal position, Al-Qazzaz was unable to return to Canada for unknown reasons. Al-Qazzaz waited another 19 months for a return to Canada and was in need of immediate medical attention. Attia and the Free Khaled al-Qazzaz campaign had been calling on Canadian and Egyptian governments as well as the international community to urgently assist in securing Al-Qazzaz’s immediate return to Canada.

On August 14, 2016, Al-Qazzaz returned to Canada.

== Political experience ==
Al-Qazzaz participated in the events of the 2011 Egyptian revolution. After the Freedom and Justice Party won the democratic election in June 2012, Khaled was asked to work for the government as a civil servant.

== Human rights work ==
During his term in the Presidential Office, Khaled Al-Qazzaz was directly involved in developing new strategies for the government. Among these initiatives, Khaled was credited with being the first to initiate a Human Rights Portfolio and desk at the Egyptian Presidency.

Alongside his political involvement, Khaled continued to advocate for investment in education and education reform as a priority for Egypt.

== Imprisonment ==
On July 3, 2013, Al-Qazzaz was detained by the Egyptian military along with the president and eight other government aides. Khaled remained in an unknown military location for five and a half months, during which time the Egyptian regime refused to acknowledge that it was holding Khaled or to confirm his whereabouts, putting him outside the protection of the law.

On December 1, 2013, Human Rights Watch issued a statement accusing the Egyptian government of forcibly disappearing Al-Qazzaz for almost five months. The statement read that Al-Qazzaz “remains detained without any legal basis at an undisclosed location.”

=== Solitary confinement ===
On December 17, 2014 Khaled was transferred to a maximum security prison, the Scorpion Wing in Tora Prison, and held in solitary confinement for over nine months. Reports later revealed that Al-Qazzaz was held in solitary confinement in a two by two meter cell in one of Egypt’s most notorious prisons.

During his confinement, Al-Qazzaz and his lawyers appeared in court on numerous occasions as part of the legal proceedings to call for an end to his detainment. Many of the court appearances ended with the judge extending Al-Qazzaz’s detainment for another 45 days for further investigations.

=== Hospitalization and release ===
On October 26, 2014, Khaled was moved to a private hospital where he continued his detention for over three months due to injuries sustained as a result of the extreme conditions of his confinement.

On Monday, December 29, 2014, the Attorney General issued an order for Al-Qazzaz’s release. Investigations with Al-Qazzaz came to an end and no charges would be issued. Al-Qazzaz was released on January 11, 2015.

When Khaled was first detained, the group Friends of Khaled came together to stand with his wife, Sarah Attia, in her efforts to bring her husband back home to Canada. This was the inception of the FreeKQ (Free Khaled al-Qazzaz) Campaign. While Friends of Khaled began as a group of university alumni who knew Khaled while he studied at the University of Toronto. Currently, Friends of Khaled has grown across Canada and internationally to include advocates of human rights.

The FreeKQ campaign has led initiatives such as phone call campaigns, letter-writing campaigns, petition campaigns, and a ‘pay-it-forward.’

== Return to education ==
Khaled was detained in Egypt for two years until 2016. He was then released and returned to Canada. While in Egypt, he was unable to travel, and his legal team worked with local authorities to facilitate his return to Canada. During that time, he resumed his Doctorate program at Walden University and re-initiated his work in Education consultancy in Egypt.

== Statements and interviews ==
Amnesty International reported that any charges brought against him were deliberately fabricated to make him appear guilty. The United Nations’ Working Group on Arbitrary Detention said that Khaled’s detention was in violation of Egyptian and international law.
