= Muslim Brotherhood =

Transnational Sunni Islamist organization

Society of the Muslim Brothers جماعة الإخوان المسلمين
- Muslim Brotherhood logo with the Arabic word for 'prepare' in calligraphy below the two crossed swords
- Leader: Disputed: Mahmoud Hussein; Salah Abdel-Haq
- Founder: Hassan al-Banna
- Founded: 22 March 1928; 98 years ago Ismailia, Kingdom of Egypt
- Headquarters: Cairo, Egypt (historical) Unclear (present)
- Ideology: Pan-Islamism; Sunni Islamism; Islamic democracy (self-proclaimed, disputed); Qutbism; Religious conservatism; Social conservatism; Anti-Zionism; Anti-imperialism; Anti-communism; Factions: Salafism; Neo-Sufism
- Political position: Right-wing
- Slogan: Islam is the solution (most famous)
- Allies: State allies: Iran (sometimes); Qatar; Turkey (alleged); Non-state allies: Hamas (until 2017)
- Designated as a terrorist group by: Argentina (three branches); Bahrain; Egypt; Germany (affiliated militant groups only); Kenya; Russia; Saudi Arabia; Ba'athist Syria (until 2024); United Arab Emirates; United States (four branches)

Party flag

Website
- ikhwanweb.com (English) ikhwanonline.com (Arabic)

The Society of the Muslim Brothers (Arabic: جماعة الإخوان المسلمين, romanized: Jamāʿat al-Ikhwān al-Muslimīn), better known as the Muslim Brotherhood (الإخوان المسلمون, al-Ikhwān al-Muslimūn), is a transnational Sunni Islamist organization founded in Egypt by Islamic scholar, imam and schoolteacher Hassan al-Banna in 1928. Al-Banna's teachings spread far beyond Egypt, influencing various Islamist movements from charitable organizations to political parties.

Initially, as a pan-Islamist, religious, and social movement, its members preached Islam in Egypt, taught the illiterate, and set up hospitals and business enterprises. The group later advanced into the political arena, aiming to end British colonial rule in Egypt. The movement's self-stated aim is the establishment of a state ruled by Sharia under a caliphate, with one of its most well-known slogans being "Islam is the solution". The group combines political activism with Islamic charity work.

The group spread to other Muslim countries but still has one of its largest organizations in Egypt, despite a succession of government crackdowns since 1948. It remained a fringe group in the politics of the Arab world until the 1967 Six-Day War, when Islamism replaced popular secular Arab nationalism after a resounding Arab defeat by the State of Israel. The movement was also supported by Saudi Arabia, with which it shared mutual enemies like communism.

The Arab Spring initially brought the group legalization and substantial political power, but that expansion had suffered reversals by 2013. The Egyptian Muslim Brotherhood was legalized in 2011 and won several elections, including the 2012 Egyptian presidential election, in which its candidate, Mohamed Morsi, became Egypt's first democratically elected president. Following massive demonstrations and unrest, Morsi was overthrown in the 2013 Egyptian coup d'état orchestrated by the military and placed under house arrest; a later review found that the Muslim Brotherhood had failed to moderate its views or embrace democratic values during its time in power. The group was then banned in Egypt and declared a terrorist organization. The Persian Gulf monarchies of Saudi Arabia and the United Arab Emirates followed suit.

The group's founder accepted the utility of political violence, and members of the Brotherhood conducted assassinations and attempted assassinations on Egyptian state figures during his lifetime, including Egyptian prime minister Mahmoud El Nokrashy Pasha in 1948. In his 1964 book Milestones (معالم في الطريق, Maʿālim fī aṭ-Ṭarīq), Sayyid Qutb, one of the group's most prominent thinkers, promoted takfirism, a doctrine permitting "the stigmatisation of other Muslims as infidel or apostate, and of existing states as un-Islamic, and the use of extreme violence in the pursuit of the perfect Islamic society"; the doctrine continues to inspire many jihadist movements. The group abandoned the use of violence in the 1970s. The Muslim Brotherhood since does not have a clear ideological platform on violence.

In recent years, the primary state backers of the Muslim Brotherhood have been Qatar and AKP-ruled Turkey. As of 2026, the flagship group or specific chapters are considered a terrorist organization by the governments of Argentina, Kenya, Germany, Bahrain, Egypt, Russia, Saudi Arabia, the United Arab Emirates, and the United States.

== Classification ==
In academic research, four different approaches to understanding the Muslim Brotherhood are distinguished. The first approach draws a clear connection between the Muslim Brotherhood and terrorist organizations such as al‑Qaeda. It is argued that the Brotherhood refrains from violence for tactical reasons and merely seeks to gain power. The organization is portrayed as a wolf in sheep's clothing that cooperates with terrorist groups and allegedly shares ideological similarities with them. The second approach overlaps partly with the first. It views the Muslim Brotherhood as an unchanging group for which a strict interpretation of the Quran and the Sunna is essential. This perspective attributes a supposedly undemocratic character to the Brotherhood; the organization is said to strive for an Islamic theocracy in individual countries and ultimately worldwide. The third approach regards the Muslim Brotherhood as an international conspiracy against the West, pursuing a hidden agenda that it skillfully conceals. Individuals associated with the Brotherhood are described as a "spider in the web" or a "Trojan horse," or compared to tentacles. This imagery suggests that the Muslim Brotherhood functions as a central, controlling power. Organizations linked to it are said to adopt different names in order to obscure their traces. The fourth approach is the most common among scholars who have conducted research on the Muslim Brotherhood. It views the organization as pragmatic, dynamic, and flexible, capable of adapting and accepting political rules of the game. The Brotherhood is seen as exerting pressure on regimes to implement democratic and constitutional reforms and as being receptive to the demands of the population. Proponents of this approach do not claim that the Muslim Brotherhood is a liberal‑democratic organization. However, they identify real, organizational, intensely debated, and ideologically grounded developments within the movement.

== Foundation and history in Egypt ==
=== Early years ===
==== Formative period (1928–1936) ====
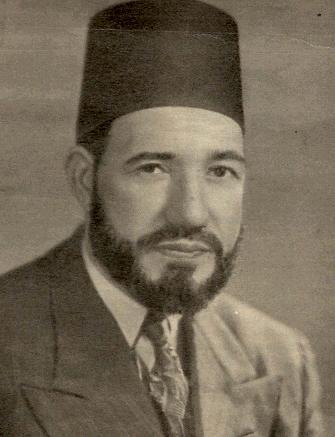
The founder of the Muslim Brotherhood, Hassan al-Banna

Hassan al-Banna founded the Muslim Brotherhood in the city of Ismailia in March 1928 along with six workers of the Suez Canal Company, as a Pan-Islamic, religious, political, and social movement. They appointed Al-Banna as their leader and vowed to work for Islam through Jihad and revive Islamic Brotherhood. Thus, the Muslim Brothers were born; under the pledge that its members would

be soldiers in the call to Islam, and in that is the life for the country and the honour for the Umma... We are brothers in the service of Islam.. Hence we are the "Muslim Brothers".

The Suez Canal Company helped Banna build the mosque in Ismailia that would serve as the Brotherhood's headquarters, according to Richard P. Mitchell's The Society of Muslim Brothers. According to al-Banna, contemporary Islam had lost its social dominance, because most Muslims had been corrupted by Western influences. Sharia law based on the Qur'an and the Sunnah were seen as laws passed down by God that should be applied to all parts of life, including the organization of the government and the handling of everyday problems.

Al-Banna was populist in his message of protecting workers against the tyranny of foreign and monopolist companies. It founded social institutions such as hospitals, pharmacies, schools, etc. Al-Banna held highly conservative views on issues such as women's rights, opposing equal rights for women, but supporting the establishment of justice towards women. The Brotherhood grew rapidly going from 800 members in 1936, to 200,000 by 1938 and over 2 million by 1948.

==== Entry into politics (1936–1939) ====
As its influence grew, it opposed British rule in Egypt starting in 1936. al-Banna had been in contact with Amin al-Husseini since 1927. A central concern for the early Muslim Brotherhood was its pro-Arab activism for the Arab-Zionist conflict in Palestine, which in 1936–1939 culminated in the great Arab revolt. While absent before the outbreak of the revolt, the Brotherhood now began to make use of aggressive anti-Jewish rhetorics which also targeted the Jewish community in Egypt. The official weekly of the Brotherhood, al-Nadhir, published a series of articles titled "The Danger of Jews", warning of alleged Jewish plots against Islam like Freemasonry or Marxism. In 1938 al-Nadhir demanded from Egypt's Jews to either adopt an openly anti-Zionist stance or to face "hostility". It also criticized the prominent role of Jews in Egypt's society and their prominence in journalism, commercial spheres and the entertainment industry. al-Nadhir even called for a boycott and their expulsion, "for they have corrupted Egypt and its population." In another instance the Jews were referred to as a "societal cancer". The Brotherhood eventually distributed a list of Jewish business owners and called for their boycott, claiming that they supported the Zionists. Such conflations of Jews and Zionists were common.

In the years preceding World War II the Muslim Brothers likely received indirect funds from Nazi Germany, maintained via the Deutsches Nachrichtenbüro in Cairo and Amin al-Husseini, who himself received funds from Italian intelligence and the Abwehr. Being interested in strengthening a militant anti-British organization, Germany may have funded the Brotherhood as early as 1934. One later British source claimed that in 1936 alone, Germany transferred over £5.000. The author Francis Nicosia found in his research however that the Germans had generally refused to assist Arab independence movements and related activities before 1938 due to a desire to keep positive relations with Britain. al-Banna and other members of the Brotherhood voiced admiration for aspects of Nazi ideology, including its militarism and its centralization revolving around a charismatic leader, but opposed others like its racial policies and ethnic nationalism. The outbreak of the war ended any relationship between Germany and the Muslim Brothers. al-Banna denied that he had ever received German funding. Italian funding of the Brotherhood is unlikely, as the latter vehemently opposed the Italian occupation of Libya.

==== World War II (1939–1945) ====
During the early part of World War II, the Brotherhood at times displayed pro-Axis sympathies. Worried, the British kept the Brotherhood under firm control by temporarily banning its newsletters, surveiling its meetings and arresting various provincial leaders. al-Banna himself was briefly taken into custody and eventually acknowledged his loyalty to the British, although the latter remained suspicious.

By 1942 the Muslim brotherhood had begun receiving British funding in coordination with the pro-British Wafd Party. During World War II the Muslim Brotherhood openly condemned the racist and chauvinist tendencies of Nazi Germany and Fascist Italy in its newspapers, something noted by a British intelligence report from 1942 which stated “although the Muslim Brotherhood may have imitated Nazi and fascist organizational forms, they have no particular sympathy for Nazi ideology”.

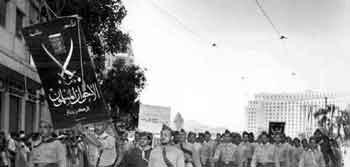
A gathering of senior youth scouts (jawala, lit. "travellers") in the 1940s.

Between 1938 and 1940 or 1941 the Brotherhood formed an armed wing called the "Secret Apparatus" (al-Nizam al-Khas), also known as "Special Apparatus". This group was a successor of the "battalions" (kata'ib) established in late 1937. Its goal was to fight the British until their expulsion from Egypt, British collaborators as well as Zionists. It also protected the Brotherhood against the police and infiltrated the Communist movement. The "Secret Apparatus" was led by a committee of five, with each of them commanding one tightly knit cell. Only the most committed members, mostly young students or men with salaried jobs, were invited to join. New members of the "Secret Apparatus" were taught to obey, were given weapons, underwent heavy physical training and were taught the concepts of Jihad and underground operations. The result was a zealous elite force. Its first operation was allegedly towards the end of World War II, when members of the group threw a bomb at a British club. Militarized youth sections were also raised, namely the junior kashafa ("scouts") and the more senior jawala ("travellers").

In 1948, al-Banna denounced fascism and militarism in his book Peace in Islam:

"Nazism came to power in Germany, Fascism in Italy and both Hitler and Mussolini began to force their people to conform to what they thought; unity, order, development, and power. Certainly, this system led the two countries to stability and a vital international role. This cultivated much hope, reawakened aspiration, and united the whole country under one leader. Then what happened? It became apparent that these seemingly powerful systems were a real disaster. The inspiration and aspirations of the people were shattered and the system of democracy did not lead to the empowerment of the people but to the establishment of chosen tyrants. Eventually after a deadly war in which innumerable men, women, and children died, these regimes collapsed."

=== Post–World War II ===
==== Conflict in Palestine and Egypt (1945–1952) ====
After the war the Brotherhood lobbied for granting Amin al-Husseini, who had served as a German propaganda mouthpiece between 1941 and 1945, asylum in Egypt. In May 1946 al-Husseini managed to escape from French imprisonment and arrived in Cairo. He received a warm welcome, especially by al-Banna, who ennobled him to a "miracle of a man" with "a divine spark in his heart which makes him above human beings", followed by a martial pledge of loyalty against the Zionists. Soon after his arrival the Arab League established the Arab Higher Executive (rebranded as Arab Higher Committee in January 1947) as supreme Palestinian party with Amin al-Husseini as Cairo-based chairman. al-Banna designated al-Husseini a local Brotherhood leader to spread the influence of the new Palestinian branch established in October 1945. Another small branch was founded in Jordan at the turn of 1946.

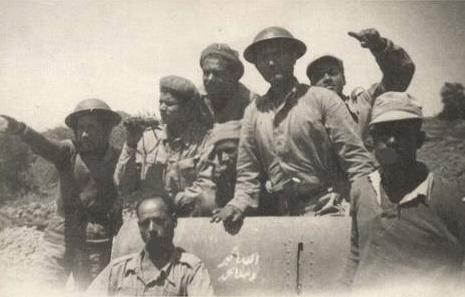
Muslim Brotherhood fighters in the 1948 Arab–Israeli War

The Brotherhood opposed the UN's involvement in Palestine from April 1947, with the latter eventually voting for its partition into a Jewish and an Arab state in November 1947. Consequently, the society prepared for war, with volunteers entering Palestine as early as October 1947. By 30 November 1947 Palestine descended into a civil war fought between the Yishuv and al-Husseini's Arab Higher Committee, eventually ending in a Palestinian defeat by May 1948. Of the 10,000 fighters al-Banna had promised in October 1947 some 1.500 were present by March 1948. The fighters came from all three branches and were originally engaged in guerrilla activities. The end of Mandatory Palestine and Israel's declaration of independence on 14 May resulted in an invasion by five Arab states in 15 May, among them Egypt. Brotherhood fighters assisted the Egyptian army northeast of Gaza, although some were also active in the West Bank. The volunteers suffered a few hundred casualties dead and wounded and had only a limited impact on the course of the war, although they played a decisive role in several engagements. The war was an Arab failure, resulting in a truce fiercely opposed by the Muslim Brothers.

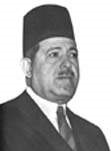
Prime minister Nokrashy Pasha, who was shot by a Brotherhood assassin after outlawing the society in 1948

On 2 November 1945 the Brotherhood organized a general strike protesting the Balfour declaration that eventually escalated into deadly riots targeting Jews and foreigners.

In March 1948 the "Secret Apparatus" assassinated a respected judge for issuing a life sentence against a Muslim Brother for attacking British soldiers. In late 1948 the Brotherhood was estimated to have 2,000 branches and 500,000 members or sympathizers. In November, following several bombings and alleged assassination attempts by the Brotherhood, the Egyptian government arrested 32 leaders of the Brotherhood's "Secret Apparatus" and banned the Brotherhood. It was accused of preparing the overthrow of the government, linked to a jeep loaded with weapons. The headquarters were closed and its funds confiscated, while 4,000 Brothers were detained and al-Banna was placed under temporary house arrest. The reaction to the dissolution was the assassination of prime minister Mahmoud El Nokrashy Pasha on 28 December by a young "Secret Apparatus" member. al-Banna claimed that the killer acted independently and publicly denounced his faith. After a failed yet lethal bombing in mid-January 1949 which was intended to destroy legal evidence pending against the Brotherhood al-Banna himself was killed in 12 February by vengeful Nokrashy supporters.

In 1952, members of the Muslim Brotherhood were accused of taking part in the Cairo Fire that destroyed some 750 buildings in downtown Cairo – mainly night clubs, theatres, hotels, and restaurants frequented by British and other foreigners.

==== Dissolution under the "Free Officers" and Nasser (1952–1970) ====
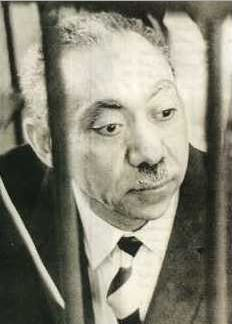
Brotherhood theorist Sayyid Qutb, who was executed in 1966

In 1952 Egypt's monarchy was overthrown by a group of nationalist military officers (Free Officers Movement) who had formed a cell within the Brotherhood during the first war against Israel in 1948. However, after the revolution Gamal Abdel Nasser, the leader of the 'free officers' cell, after deposing the first president of Egypt, Muhammad Neguib, in a coup, quickly moved against the Brotherhood, blaming them for an attempt on his life. The Brotherhood was again banned and this time thousands of its members were imprisoned, many being tortured and held for years in prisons and concentration camps. In the 1950s and 1960s many Brotherhood members sought sanctuary in Saudi Arabia. From the 1950s, al-Banna's son-in-law Said Ramadan emerged as a major leader of the Brotherhood and the movement's unofficial foreign minister. Ramadan built a major center for the Brotherhood centered on a mosque in Munich, which became "a refuge for the beleaguered group during its decades in the wilderness". In the 1960s, Ramadan worked closely with Mahmoud K. Muftić, a Bosnian Muslim exile who had married his cousin, who helped build links between the Muslim Brotherhood and various anti-communist exile groups in Europe and the Middle East.

In the 1970s after the death of Nasser and under the new President (Anwar Sadat), the Egyptian Brotherhood was invited back to Egypt and began a new phase of participation in Egyptian politics.

=== Mubarak era ===
During the Mubarak era, observers both defended and criticized the Brotherhood. It was the largest opposition group in Egypt, calling for "Islamic reform", and a democratic system in Egypt. It had built a vast network of support through Islamic charities working among poor Egyptians. According to ex-Knesset member and author Uri Avnery the Brotherhood was religious but pragmatic, "deeply embedded in Egyptian history, more Arab and more Egyptian than fundamentalist". It formed "an old established party which has earned much respect with its steadfastness in the face of recurrent persecution, torture, mass arrests and occasional executions. Its leaders are untainted by the prevalent corruption, and admired for their commitment to social work". It also developed a significant movement online.

In the 2005 parliamentary elections, the Brotherhood became "in effect, the first opposition party of Egypt's modern era". Despite electoral irregularities, including the arrest of hundreds of Brotherhood members, and having to run its candidates as independents (the organization being technically illegal), the Brotherhood won 88 seats (20% of the total) compared to 14 seats for the legal opposition.

During its term in parliament, the Brotherhood "posed a democratic political challenge to the regime, not a theological one", according to one The New York Times journalist, while another report praised it for attempting to transform "the Egyptian parliament into a real legislative body", that represented citizens and kept the government "accountable".

But fears remained about its commitment to democracy, equal rights, and freedom of expression and belief—or lack thereof. In December 2006, a campus demonstration by Brotherhood students in uniforms, demonstrating martial arts drills, betrayed to some such as Jameel Theyabi, "the group's intent to plan for the creation of militia structures, and a return by the group to the era of 'secret cells'". Another report highlighted the Muslim Brotherhood's efforts in Parliament to combat what one member called the "current US-led war against Islamic culture and identity," forcing the Minister of Culture at the time, Farouk Hosny, to ban the publication of three novels on the ground they promoted blasphemy and unacceptable sexual practices. In October 2007, the Muslim Brotherhood issued a detailed political platform. Among other things, it called for a board of Muslim clerics to oversee the government, and limiting the office of the presidency to Muslim men. In the "Issues and Problems" chapter of the platform, it declared that a woman was not suited to be president because the office's religious and military duties "conflict with her nature, social and other humanitarian roles". While proclaiming "equality between men and women in terms of their human dignity", the document warned against "burdening women with duties against their nature or role in the family".

Internally, some leaders in the Brotherhood disagreed on whether to adhere to Egypt's 32-year peace treaty with Israel. A deputy leader declared the Brotherhood would seek dissolution of the treaty, while a Brotherhood spokesman stated the Brotherhood would respect the treaty as long as "Israel shows real progress on improving the lot of the Palestinians".

=== 2011 revolution and after ===
Following the 2011 Egyptian revolution and fall of Hosni Mubarak, the Brotherhood was legalized and was at first very successful, dominating the 2011 parliamentary election and winning the 2012 presidential election, before the overthrow of President Mohamed Morsi a year later, leading to a crackdown on the Brotherhood again.

On 30 April 2011, the Brotherhood launched a new party called the Freedom and Justice Party, which won 235 of the 498 seats in the 2011 Egyptian parliamentary elections, far more than any other party. The party rejected the "candidacy of women or Copts for Egypt's presidency", but not for cabinet positions.

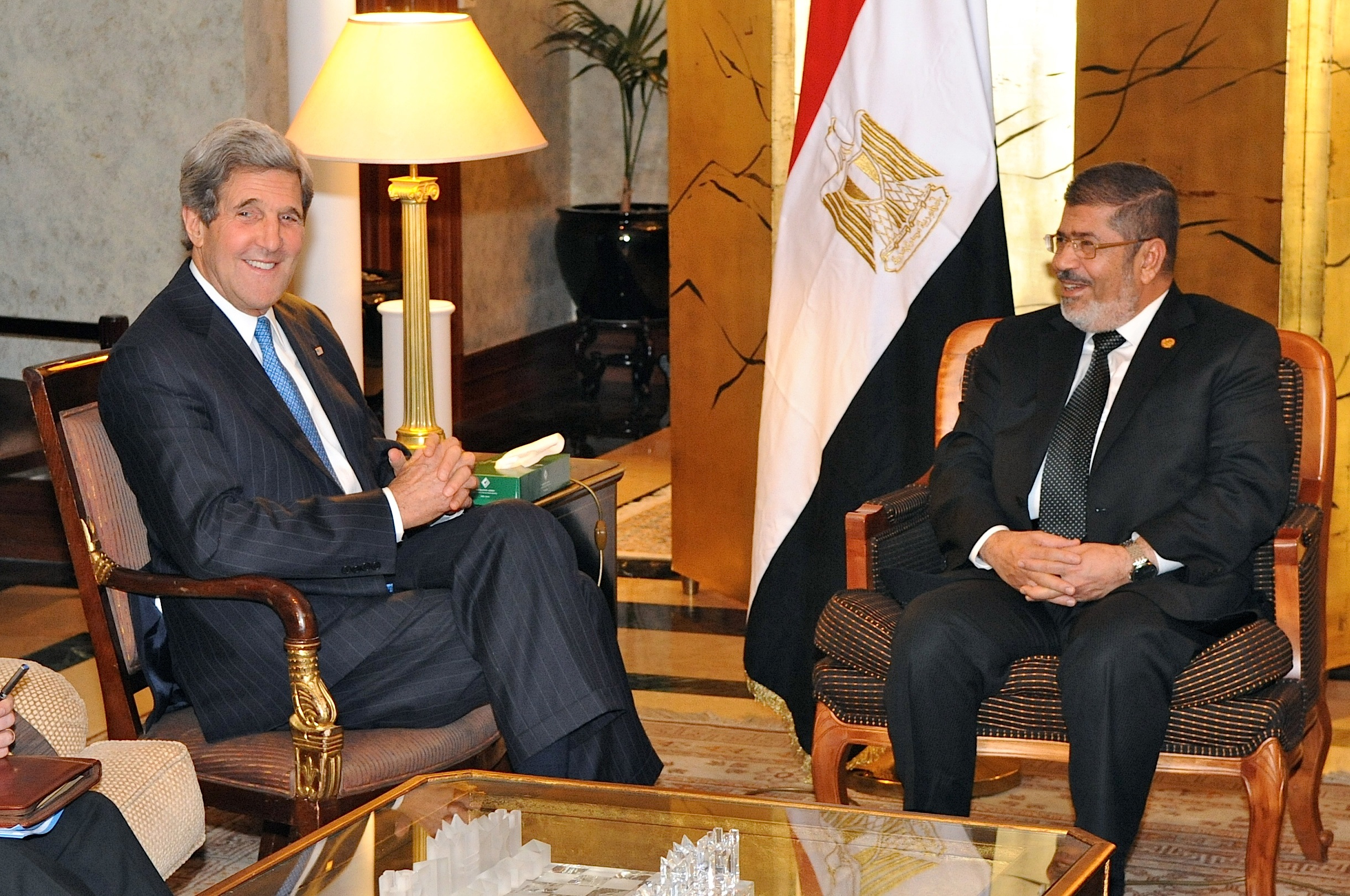
Then-U.S. secretary of state John Kerry meeting with then-Egyptian president Mohamed Morsi, May 2013

The Muslim Brotherhood's candidate for Egypt's 2012 presidential election was Mohamed Morsi, who defeated Ahmed Shafiq—the last prime minister under Mubarak's rule—with 51.73% of the vote. Although during his campaign Morsi himself promised to stand for peaceful relations with Israel, some high level supporters and former Brotherhood officials (from the organization's 15-member Guidance Council) reiterated hostility towards Zionism. For example, Egyptian cleric Safwat Hegazi spoke at the announcement rally for the Muslim Brotherhood's candidate Morsi and expressed his hope and belief that Morsi would liberate Gaza, restore the Caliphate of the "United States of the Arabs" with Jerusalem as its capital, and that "our cry shall be: 'Millions of martyrs march towards Jerusalem.'" Within a short period, serious public opposition developed to President Morsi. In late November 2012, he temporarily granted himself the power to legislate without judicial oversight or review of his acts, on the grounds that he needed to protect the nation from the Mubarak-era power structure. He also put a draft constitution to a referendum that opponents complained was "an Islamist coup". These issues—and concerns over the prosecutions of journalists, the unleashing of pro-Brotherhood gangs on nonviolent demonstrators, the continuation of military trials, new laws that permitted detention without judicial review for up to 30 days, brought hundreds of thousands of protesters to the streets starting in November 2012.

By April 2013, Egypt had "become increasingly divided" between President Mohamed Morsi and "Islamist allies" and an opposition of "moderate Muslims, Christians and liberals". Opponents accused "Morsi and the Muslim Brotherhood of seeking to monopolize power, while Morsi's allies say the opposition is trying to destabilize the country to derail the elected leadership". Adding to the unrest were severe fuel shortages and electricity outages, which raised suspicions among some Egyptians that the end of gas and electricity shortages since the ouster of President Mohamed Morsi was evidence of a conspiracy to undermine him, although other Egyptians say it was evidence of Morsi's mismanagement of the economy.

On 3 July 2013, Mohamed Morsi was removed from office and put into house arrest by the military, that happened shortly after mass protests against him began. demanding the resignation of Morsi. There were also significant counter-protests in support of Morsi; those were originally intended to celebrate the one-year anniversary of Morsi's inauguration, and started days before the uprising. On 14 August, the interim government declared a month-long state of emergency, and riot police cleared the pro-Morsi sit-in during the Rabaa sit-in dispersal of August 2013. Violence escalated rapidly following armed protesters attacking police, according to the National Council for Human Rights' report; this led to the deaths of over 600 people and injury of some 4,000, with the incident resulting in the most casualties in Egypt's modern history. In retaliation, Brotherhood supporters looted and burned police stations and dozens of churches in response to the violence, though a Muslim Brotherhood spokesperson condemned the attacks on Christians and instead blamed military leaders for plotting the attacks. The crackdown that followed has been called the worst for the Brotherhood's organization "in eight decades". By 19 August, Al Jazeera reported that "most" of the Brotherhood's leaders were in custody. On that day Supreme Leader Mohammed Badie was arrested, crossing a "red line", as even Hosni Mubarak had never arrested him. On 23 September, a court ordered the group outlawed and its assets seized. Prime Minister, Hazem Al Beblawi on 21 December 2013, declared the Muslim Brotherhood as a terrorist organisation after a car bomb ripped through a police building and killed at least 14 people in the city of Mansoura, which the government blamed on the Muslim Brotherhood, despite no evidence and an unaffiliated Sinai-based terror group claiming responsibility for the attack.

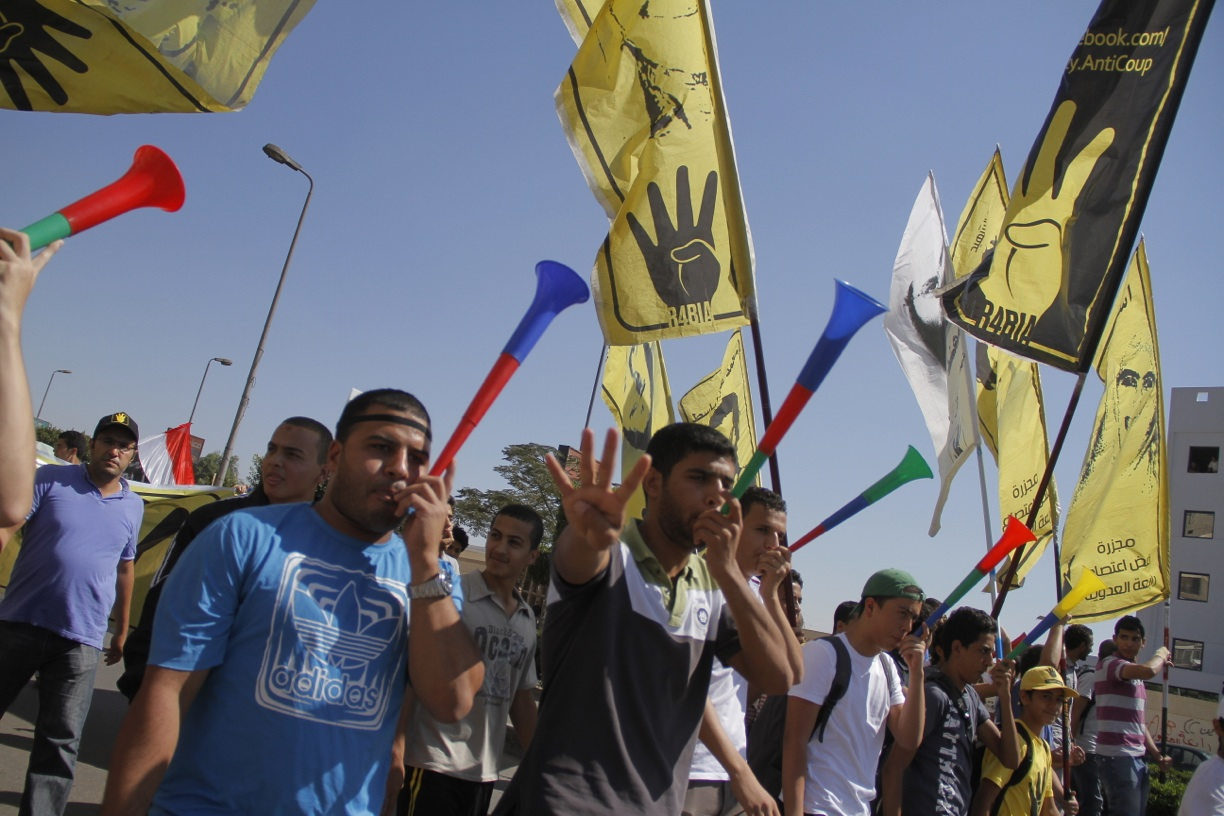
A group of pro-Brotherhood protesters holding the Rabia sign and making the associated gesture during a pro-Brotherhood protest held in October 2013

On 24 March 2014, an Egyptian court sentenced 529 members of the Muslim Brotherhood to death following an attack on a police station, an act described by Amnesty International as "the largest single batch of simultaneous death sentences we've seen in recent years [...] anywhere in the world". By May 2014, approximately 16,000 people (and as high as more than 40,000 by what The Economist calls an "independent count"), mostly Brotherhood members or supporters, have allegedly been arrested by police since the 2013 uprising. On 2 February 2015, an Egyptian court sentenced another 183 members of the Muslim Brotherhood to death.

An editorial in The New York Times claimed that "leaders of the Muslim Brotherhood, which became the leading political movement in the wake of Egypt's 2011 popular uprising, are languishing in prison, unfairly branded as terrorists. ... Egypt's crushing authoritarianism could well persuade a significant number of its citizens that violence is the only tool they have for fighting back".

Mohamed Morsi was sentenced to death on 16 May 2015, along with 120 others.

The Muslim Brotherhood claimed that Muslims did not carry out the Botroseya Church bombing and claimed it was a false flag conspiracy by the Egyptian government and Copts, in a statement released in Arabic on the FJP's website, but its claim was challenged by 100 Women participant Nervana Mahmoud and Hoover Institution and Hudson Institute fellow Samuel Tadros. The Muslim Brotherhood released an English-language commentary on the bombing and said it condemned the terrorist attack.

Qatar-based Muslim Brotherhood members are suspected to have helped a Muslim Brotherhood agent carry out the bombing, according to the Egyptian government. The Qatar-based supporter was named as Mohab Mostafa El-Sayed Qassem. The terrorist was named as Mahmoud Shafiq Mohamed Mostaf.

The Arabic-language website of the Muslim Brotherhood commemorated the anniversary of the death of its leader, Hassan al-Banna, and repeated his words calling for the teachings of Islam to spread all over the world and to raise the "flag of Jihad", taking their land, "regaining their glory", "including diaspora Muslims" and demanding an Islamic state and a Muslim government, a Muslim people, a Muslim house, and Muslim individuals.

Mekameleen TV, a Turkey-based free-to-air satellite television channel run by exiled Brotherhood supporters, mourned his death and claimed it was "martyrdom". Mekameleen supports the Brotherhood. Condolences were sent upon Omar Abdel Rahman's death by the website of the Muslim Brotherhood's Freedom and Justice Party in Egypt.

=== Controversy ===
How much of the blame for the fall from power in Egypt of the Brotherhood and its allied Freedom and Justice Party (FJP) can be placed on the Brotherhood, and how much of it can be placed on its enemies in the Egyptian bureaucracy, media and security establishment is disputed. The Mubarak government's state media portrayed the Brotherhood as secretive and illegal, and numerous TV channels such as OnTV spent much of their air time vilifying the organization. But the Brotherhood took a number of controversial steps and also acquiesced to or supported crackdowns by the military during Morsi's presidency. Before the revolution, the Muslim Brotherhood's supporters appeared at a protest at Al-Azhar University wearing military-style fatigues, after which the Mubarak government accused the organization of starting an underground militia. When it came to power, the Muslim Brotherhood indeed tried to establish armed groups of supporters and it sought official permission for its members to be armed.

=== General leaders ===
Supreme guides or General leaders of the Muslim Brotherhood have been:

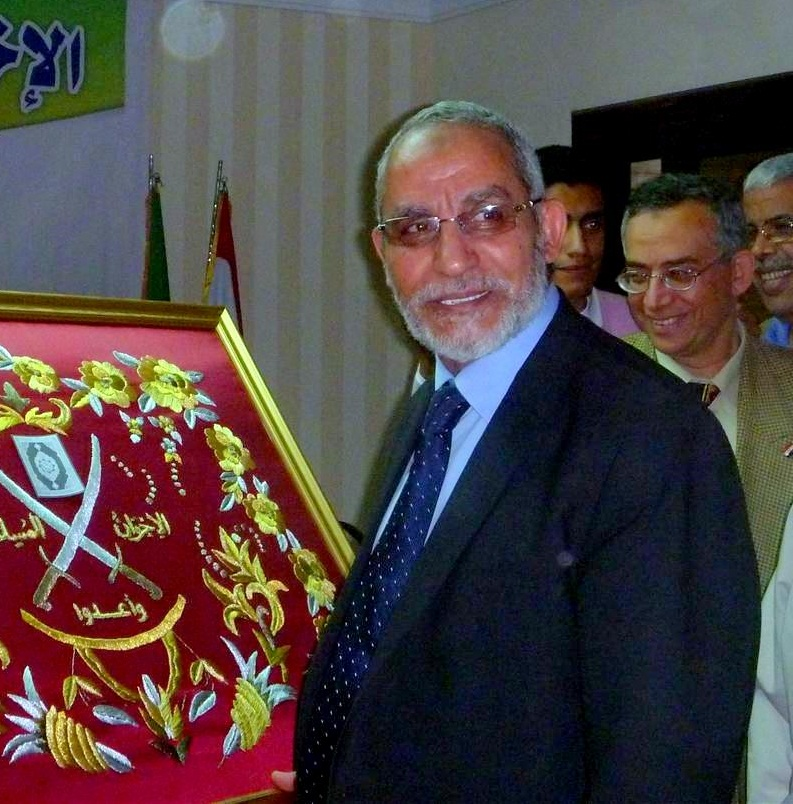
Mohammed Badie, the current leader

- Founder and first General Leader: (1928–1949) Hassan al-Banna حسن البنا
- 1949–1972 Hassan al-Hudaybi حسن الهضيبي
- 1972–1986 Umar al-Tilmisani عمر التلمساني
- 1986–1996 Muhammad Hamid Abu al-Nasr محمد حامد أبو النصر
- 1996–2002 Mustafa Mashhur مصطفى مشهور
- 2002–2004 Ma'mun al-Hudaybi مأمون الهضيبي
- 2004–2010 Mohammed Mahdi Akef محمد مهدي عاكف
- 2010– Mohammed Badie محمد بديع

== Presence outside of Egypt ==
=== In the Middle East ===
==== Bahrain ====
Following parliamentary elections in 2002, Al Menbar became the largest joint party with eight seats in the forty-seat Chamber of Deputies. Prominent members of Al Menbar include Dr. Salah Abdulrahman, Dr. Salah Al Jowder, and outspoken MP Mohammed Khalid. Additionally, it has strongly opposed the government's accession to the International Covenant on Civil and Political Rights.

==== Iran ====
Iranian Call and Reform Organization, a Sunni Islamist group active in Iran, predominantly among Kurds, has been described as an organization "that belongs to the Muslim Brotherhood" or "Iranian Muslim Brotherhood", while it has officially stated that it is not affiliated with the latter.

==== Turkey ====
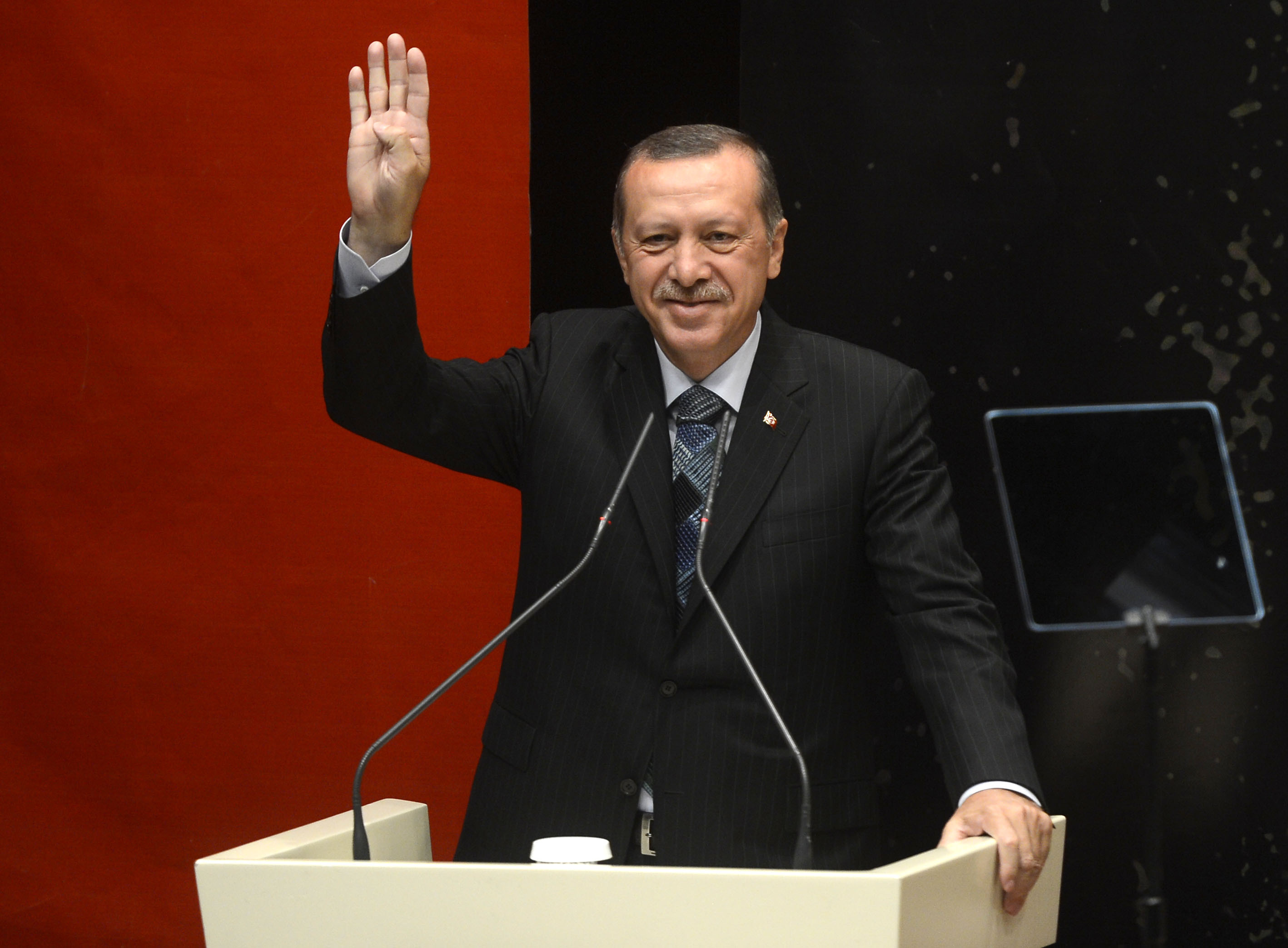
Erdoğan performing the Rabaa gesture (which is used by Muslim Brotherhood supporters in Egypt protesting against the post-Brotherhood authorities)

The Turkish AKP, the ruling party of Turkey, publicly supported the Muslim Brotherhood during and a few months after the overthrow of the Muslim Brotherhood-affiliated Egyptian president Mohamed Morsi in July 2013. Then-Turkish prime minister Recep Tayyip Erdoğan claimed in an interview that this was because "Turkey would stand by whoever was elected as a result of legitimate elections." According to the Carnegie Endowment for International Peace, each year after Morsi's overthrow has seen the AKP "significantly detach itself from the Muslim Brotherhood in Egypt."

==== Iraq ====
The Iraqi Islamic Party was formed in 1960 as the Iraqi branch of the Brotherhood, but was banned from 1961 during the nationalist rule of Abd al-Karim Qasim. As government repression hardened under the Baath Party from February 1963, the group was forced to continue underground. After the fall of the Saddam Hussein government in 2003, the Islamic Party has reemerged as one of the main advocates of the country's Sunni community. Its leader is Iraqi Vice-president Tariq Al-Hashimi.

The Muslim Brotherhood was an active participation in the "Faith Campaign".

Khaled al-Obaidi said that he received a death threat and was declared a non-Muslim by the Muslim Brotherhood.

Also, in the north of Iraq there are several Islamic movements inspired by or part of the Muslim Brotherhood network. The Kurdistan Islamic Union (KIU), a small political party holding 10 seats in the Kurdish parliament, was believed to be supportive of the Muslim Brotherhood in the 90's. The group leaders and members have been continuously arrested by Kurdish authorities.

==== Israel ====
'Abd al-Rahman al-Banna, the brother of the Muslim Brotherhood founder Hasan al-Banna, went to Mandatory Palestine and established the Muslim Brotherhood there in 1935. Al-Hajj Amin al-Husseini, eventually appointed by the British as Grand Mufti of Jerusalem in hopes of accommodating him, was the leader of the group in Palestine. Another important leader associated with the Muslim Brotherhood in Palestine was 'Izz al-Din al-Qassam, an inspiration to Islamists because he had been the first to lead an armed resistance in the name of Palestine against the British in 1935.

Brotherhood members fought alongside the Arab armies during the 1948 Arab–Israeli war, and, after Israel's creation, the ensuing Palestinian refugee crisis encouraged more Palestinian Muslims to join the group. After the war, in the West Bank, the group's activity was mainly social and religious, not political, so it had relatively good relations with Jordan during the Jordanian annexation of the West Bank. In contrast, the group frequently clashed with the Egyptian government that controlled the Gaza Strip until 1967.

In the 1950s and 1960s, the Brotherhood's goal was "the upbringing of an Islamic generation" through the restructuring of society and religious education, rather than opposition to Israel, and so it lost popularity to insurgent movements and the presence of Hizb ut-Tahrir. Eventually, however, the Brotherhood was strengthened by several factors:

1. The creation of al-Mujamma' al-Islami, the Islamic Center in 1973 by Shaykh Ahmad Yasin had a centralizing effect that encapsulated all religious organizations.
2. The Muslim Brotherhood Society in Jordan and Palestine was created from a merger of the branches in the West Bank and Gaza and Jordan.
3. Palestinian disillusion with the Palestinian militant groups caused them to become more open to alternatives.
4. The Islamic Revolution in Iran offered inspiration to Palestinians. The Brotherhood was able to increase its efforts in Palestine and avoid being dismantled like militant groups because it did not focus on the occupation. While militant groups were being dismantled, the Brotherhood filled the void.

In 2006, the Brotherhood supported Hezbollah's military action against Israel. It does not recognize the State of Israel.

==== Palestine ====
Between 1967 and 1987, the year Hamas was founded, the number of mosques in Gaza tripled from 200 to 600, and the Muslim Brotherhood named the period between 1975 and 1987 a phase of "social institution building." During that time, the Brotherhood established associations, used zakat (alms giving) for aid to poor Palestinians, promoted schools, provided students with loans, used waqf (religious endowments) to lease property and employ people, and established mosques. Likewise, antagonistic and sometimes violent opposition to Fatah, the Palestine Liberation Organization and other secular nationalist groups increased dramatically in the streets and on university campuses.

In 1987, following the First Intifada, the Islamic Resistance Movement, or Hamas was established from Brotherhood-affiliated charities and social institutions that had gained a strong foothold among the local population. During the First Intifada (1987–93), Hamas militarized and transformed into one of the strongest Palestinian militant groups.

The Hamas takeover of the Gaza Strip in 2007 was the first time since the Sudanese coup of 1989 that brought Omar al-Bashir to power, that a Muslim Brotherhood group ruled a significant geographic territory. However, the 2013 overthrow of the Mohammad Morsi government in Egypt significantly weakened Hamas's position, leading to a blockade of Gaza and economic crisis.

==== Jordan ====
The Muslim Brotherhood in Jordan originates from the merging of two separate groups which represent the two components of the Jordanian public: the Transjordanian and the West Bank Palestinian.

On 9 November 1945 the Association of the Muslim Brotherhood (Jam'iyat al-Ikhwan al-Muslimin) was officially registered and Abu Qura became its first General Supervisor. Abu Qura originally brought the Brotherhood to Jordan from Egypt after extensive study and spread of the teachings of Imam Hasan al-Banna. While most political parties and movements were banned for a long time in Jordan such as Hizb ut-Tahrir, the Brotherhood was exempted and allowed to operate by the Jordanian monarchy. In 1948, Egypt, Syria, and Transjordan offered "volunteers" to help Palestine in its war against Israel. Due to the defeat and weakening of Palestine, the Transjordanian and Palestinian Brotherhood merged.

The newly merged Muslim Brotherhood in Jordan was primarily concerned with providing social services and charitable work as well as with politics and its role in the parliament. It was seen as compatible with the political system and supported democracy without the forced implementation of Sharia law which was part of its doctrine. However, internal pressures from younger members of the Brotherhood who called for more militant actions as well as his failing health, Abu Qura resigned as the leader of the Jordanian Muslim Brotherhood. On 26 December 1953, Muhammad 'Abd al-Rahman Khalifa, was elected by the movement's administrative committee as the new leader of the Transjordanian Brotherhood and he retained this position until 1994. Khalifa was different from his predecessor and older members of the organization because he was not educated in Cairo, he was educated in Syria and Palestine. He established close ties with Palestinian Islamists during his educational life which led him to be jailed for several months in Jordan for criticizing Arab armies in the war.

Khalifa also reorganized the Brotherhood and applied to the government to designate the Brotherhood as "a comprehensive and general Islamic Committee, instead of the previous basis of operation under the Societies and Clubs Law". This allowed the Brotherhood to spread throughout the country each with slight socioeconomic and political differences although the majority of the members were of the upper middle class. The radicalization of the Brotherhood began to take place after the peace process between Egypt and Israel, the Islamic Revolution of Iran, as well as their open criticism towards the Jordan-US relationship in the 1970s. Support for the Syrian branch of the Brotherhood also aided the radicalization of the group through open support and training for the rebel forces in Syria. The ideology began to transform into a more militant one which without it would not have the support of the Islamic radicals.

The Jordanian Brotherhood has formed its own political party, the Islamic Action Front. In 1989 they become the largest group in parliament, with 23 out of 80 seats, and 9 other Islamist allies. A Brother was elected president of the National Assembly and the cabinet formed in January 1991 included several MBs.

In 2011, against the backdrop of the Arab Spring, the Jordanian Muslim Brotherhood "mobilized popular protests on a larger, more regular, and more oppositional basis than ever before". and had uniquely positioned themselves as "the only traditional political actor to have remained prominent during [the] new phase of post-Arab Spring activism" which led King Abdullah II and then-Prime Minister Marouf al-Bakhit to invite the Muslim Brotherhood to join Bakhit's cabinet, an offer they refused. The Muslim Brotherhood also boycotted the 2011 Jordanian municipal elections and led the 2011–12 Jordanian protests demanding a constitutional monarchy and electoral reforms, which resulted in the firing of Prime Minister Bakhit and the calling of early general elections in 2013.

As of late 2013, the movement in Jordan was described as being in "disarray". The instability and conflict with the monarchy has led the relationship between the two to crumble. In 2015, some 400 members of the Muslim Brotherhood defected from the original group including top leaders and founding members, to establish another Islamic group, with an allegedly moderate stance. The defectors said that they didn't like how things were run in the group and due to the group's relations with Hamas, Qatar and Turkey, which put suspicion on the group questioning if they are under the influence and working for the benefit of these states and organizations on the expense of the Jordanian state.

On 13 April 2016, Jordanian police raided and shut the Muslim Brotherhood headquarters in Amman. This comes despite the fact that the Jordanian branch cut ties with the mother Egyptian group in January 2016, a designated terrorist organization, a move that is considered to be exclusively cosmetic by experts. Jordanian authorities state that the reason of closure is because that the Brotherhood is unlicensed and is using the name of the defectors' licensed group. This comes after the Jordanian senate passed a new legislation for the regulation of political parties in 2014, the Muslim Brotherhood did not adhere by the regulations of the new law and so they did not renew their membership.

In 2020, a Jordanian Court of Cassation decided that the local branch of the Muslim Brotherhood will be dissolved after the branch did not renew its license after a new law was issued on organizations.

On 23 April 2025, Jordan's Interior Minister Mazin Al Farrayeh announced the immediate ban of the Muslim Brotherhood and the seizure of its assets and offices, following the uncovering of a sabotage plot linked to members of the group. The Muslim Brotherhood has had a longstanding presence in Jordan, officially registered in 1945, and has been involved in both social services and political activities, including forming its own political party, the Islamic Action Front. Over the years, the group has experienced internal divisions and increasing tensions with the Jordanian government, leading to previous actions such as the 2016 closure of its headquarters and a 2020 court ruling ordering its dissolution for failing to renew its license. This latest move reflects the government's ongoing efforts to curb the organization's influence within the country.

==== Qatar ====
In 1999 the Muslim Brotherhood was disbanded in Qatar. The country's longstanding support for the group has been often explained as determined by a strategic calculus that limited the role played by religion in Qatar. As the director of the Center for International and Regional Studies at the Doha-based branch of Georgetown University, Mehran Kamrava, posited, Qatar presenting itself as the state patron of the Muslim Brotherhood has caused religion in Qatar to not "play any role in articulating or forming oppositional sentiments."

Qatar's patronage has been primarily expressed through the ruling family's endorsement of Muslim Brotherhood's most representative figures, especially Yusuf al-Qaradawi. Qaradawi is a prominent, yet controversial Sunni preacher and theologian who continues to serve as the spiritual leader of the Muslim Brotherhood. An Egyptian citizen, Qaradawi fled Egypt for Qatar in 1961 after being imprisoned under President Gamal Abdul Nasser. In 1962 he chaired the Qatari Secondary Institute of Religious Studies, and in 1977 he founded and directed the Shariah and Islamic Studies department at the University of Qatar. He left Qatar to return to Egypt shortly before the 2011 Egyptian revolution.

For twenty years, Qaradawi has hosted a popular show titled Shariah and Life on the Qatari-based media channel Al-Jazeera, a government sponsored channel notoriously supportive of the Muslim Brotherhood and Islamism and often designated as a propaganda outlet for the Qatari government. From that platform, he has promoted his Islamist—and often radical views—on life, politics, and culture.

His positions, as well as his controversial ties to extremist and terrorist individuals and organizations, made him persona non grata to the U.S., UK and French governments respectively in 1999, 2008, and 2012.

Before 2013, however, Qatar had made a substantial investment on Morsi's leadership and had devolved about $10 million to Egypt since Morsi was elected, allegedly also to "buy political advantage" in the country.

In December 2019, Qatari Foreign Minister Mohammed bin Abdulrahman Al Thani told CNN in an interview that Qatar never supported Muslim Brotherhood and does not fund terrorism.

==== Kuwait ====
Egyptian Brethren came to Kuwait in the 1950s as refugees from Arab nationalism and integrated into the education ministry and other parts of the state. The Brotherhood's charity arm in Kuwait is called Al Eslah (Social Reform Society) and its political arm is called the Islamic Constitutional Movement (ICM) or "Hadas". Members of ICM have been elected to parliament and served in the government and are "widely believed to hold sway with the Ministry of Awqaf" (Islamic endowment) and Islamic Affairs, but have never reached a majority or even a plurality—"a fact that has required them to be pragmatic about working with other political groups". During the invasion of Kuwait, the Kuwait MB (along with other MB in the Gulf States) supported the American-Saudi coalition forces against Iraq and "quit the brotherhood's international agency in protest" over its pro-Saddam stand. However following the Arab Spring and the crackdown on the Egyptian Brotherhood, the Saudi government has put "pressure on other states that have Muslim Brotherhood adherents, asking them to decree that the group is a terrorist organization", and the local Kuwaiti and other Gulf state Brotherhoods have not been spared pressure from their local governments.

==== Saudi Arabia ====
The Kingdom of Saudi Arabia helped the Brotherhood financially for "over half a century", but the two became estranged during the Gulf War, and enemies after the election of Mohamed Morsi. Inside the kingdom, before the crushing of the Egyptian MB, the Brotherhood was called a group whose "many quiet supporters" made it "one of the few potential threats" to the royal family's control.

The Brotherhood first had an impact inside Saudi Arabia in 1954 when thousands of Egyptian Brethren sought to escape president Gamal Abdel Nasser's clampdown, while (the largely illiterate) Saudi Arabia was looking for teachers—who were also conservative pious Arab Muslims—for its newly created public school system. The Muslim Brotherhood's brand of Islam and Islamic politics differs from the Salafi creed called Wahhabiyya, officially held by the state of Saudi Arabia, and MB members "obeyed orders of the ruling family and ulama to not attempt to proselytize or otherwise get involved in religious doctrinal matters within the Kingdom. Nonetheless, the group "methodically ... took control of Saudi Arabia's intellectual life" by publishing books and participating in discussion circles and salons held by princes. Although the organization had no "formal organizational presence" in the Kingdom, (no political groups or parties are allowed to operate openly) MB members became "entrenched both in Saudi society and in the Saudi state, taking a leading role in key governmental ministries". In particular, many established themselves in Saudi educational system. One expert on Saudi affairs (Stephane Lacroix) has stated: "The education system is so controlled by the Muslim Brotherhood, it will take 20 years to change—if at all. Islamists see education as their base" in Saudi Arabia.

Relations between the Saudi ruling family and the Brotherhood became strained with Saudi opposition to Iraq's invasion of Kuwait and the willingness of Saudi government to allow US troops to be based in the Kingdom to fight Iraq. The Brotherhood supported the Sahwah ("Awakening") movement that pushed for political change in the Kingdom. In 2002, the then Saudi Interior Minister Prince Nayef denounced the Brotherhood, saying it was guilty of "betrayal of pledges and ingratitude" and was "the source of all problems in the Islamic world". The ruling family was also alarmed by the Arab Spring and the example set by the Muslim Brotherhood in Egypt, with president Mohamed Morsi bringing an Islamist government to power by means of popular revolution and elections. Sahwa figures published petitions for reform addressed to the royal government (in violation of Wahhabi quietist doctrine). After the overthrow of the Morsi government in Egypt, all the major Sahwa figures signed petitions and statements denouncing the removal of Morsi and the Saudi government support for it.

In March 2014, in a "significant departure from its past official stance" the Saudi government declared the Brotherhood a "terrorist organization", followed with a royal decree announced that, from now on,

belonging to intellectual or religious trends or groups that are extremist or categorized as terrorist at the local, regional or international level, as well supporting them, or showing sympathy for their ideas and methods in whichever way, or expressing support for them through whichever means, or offering them financial or moral support, or inciting others to do any of this or promoting any such actions in word or writing

will be punished by a prison sentence "of no less than three years and no more than twenty years".

==== Syria ====
The Muslim Brotherhood in Syria was founded in the 1930s (according to lexicorient.com) or in 1945, a year before independence from France, (according to journalist Robin Wright). In the first decade or so of independence it was part of the legal opposition, and in the 1961 parliamentary elections it won ten seats (5.8% of the house). But after the 1963 coup that brought the secular Ba'ath Party to power it was banned. It played a major role in the mainly Sunni-based movement that opposed the secularist, pan-Arabist Ba'ath Party. This conflict developed into an armed struggle that continued until culminating in the Hama uprising of 1982, when the rebellion was crushed by the military.

Membership in the Syrian Brotherhood became a capital offense in Syria in 1980 (under Emergency Law 49, which was revoked in 2011), but the headquarters of the Muslim Brotherhood-linked Palestinian group, Hamas, was located in the Syria's capital Damascus, where it was given Syrian government support. This has been cited as an example of the lack of international centralization or even coordination of the Muslim Brotherhood.

The Brotherhood is said to have "resurrected itself" and become the "dominant group" in the opposition by 2012 during the Syrian Civil War according to the Washington Post newspaper. But by 2013 another source described it as having "virtually no influence on the conflict". Syrian president Bashar al-Assad welcomed the fall of the Muslim Brotherhood in Egypt and remarked that "Arab identity is back on the right track after the fall from power of Egypt's Muslim Brotherhood, which had used religion for its own political gain".

A major turning point for the Muslim Brotherhood in Syria came in December 2024, when the Ba'ath regime fell and the president fled the country. The succeeding government and president have been directly linked to the Brotherhood.

==== United Arab Emirates ====
Muslim Brotherhood presence in the United Arab Emirates began with the formation of the Al Islah group in the United Arab Emirates in 1974 with the approval of Sheikh Rashid bin Saeed Al Maktoum.

Al Islah in the UAE has openly stated that it shares ideology with the Muslim Brotherhood in Egypt. Al Islah has criticized the UAE for the country's religious tolerance and presence of community Christian churches in the UAE. Since its formation, its members have sought to impose control on state social issues, such as promoting several measures limiting the rights of women. Emirati Al Islah member Tharwat Kherbawi said the Muslim Brotherhood finds the present UAE government to be an "impediment", and the country itself to be a "treasure and a crucial strategic and economic prize".

Al Islah was reported to have been secretly forming a military wing that has sought to recruit retired military officers and young Emiratis and is alleged to have plotted the overthrow of the current government and the establishment of an Islamist state in the UAE.

In March 2013, a trial began in Abu Dhabi for 94 individuals linked to Al Islah for an attempted coup on the government. Of the 94, 56 suspects received prison sentences ranging between three and ten years. Eight suspects were sentenced in absentia to 15 years in jail and 26 were acquitted.

On 7 March 2014, the Muslim Brotherhood was designated as a terrorist group by the UAE government.

==== Yemen ====
The Muslim Brothers fought with North Yemen in the NDF rebellion as Islamic Front. The Muslim Brotherhood is the political arm of the Yemeni Congregation for Reform, commonly known as Al-Islah. Former president Ali Abdullah Saleh made substantial efforts to entrench the accusations of being in league with Al Qaeda.

The Treasury Department of the US used the label "Bin Laden loyalist" for Abdul Majeed al-Zindani, the Yemeni Muslim Brotherhood's leader.

=== Rest of Africa ===
==== Algeria ====
The Muslim Brotherhood reached Algeria during the later years of the French colonial presence in the country (1830–1962). Sheikh Ahmad Sahnoun led the organization in Algeria between 1953 and 1954 during the French colonialism. Brotherhood members and sympathizers took part in the uprising against France in 1954–1962, but the movement was marginalized during the largely secular FLN one-party rule which was installed at independence in 1962. It remained unofficially active, sometimes protesting the government and calling for increased Islamization and Arabization of the country's politics.

When a multi-party system was introduced in Algeria in the early 1990s, the Muslim Brotherhood formed the Movement of Society for Peace (MSP, previously known as Hamas), led by Mahfoud Nahnah until his death in 2003 (he was succeeded by present party leader Boudjerra Soltani). The Muslim Brotherhood in Algeria did not join the Front islamique du salut (FIS), which emerged as the leading Islamist group, winning the 1991 elections and which was banned in 1992 following a military coup d'état, although some Brotherhood sympathizers did. The Brotherhood subsequently also refused to join the violent post-coup uprising by FIS sympathizers and the Armed Islamic Groups (GIA) against the Algerian state and military which followed, and urged a peaceful resolution to the conflict and a return to democracy. It has thus remained a legal political organization and enjoyed parliamentary and government representation. In 1995, Sheikh Nahnah ran for President of Algeria finishing second with 25.38% of the popular vote. During the 2000s (decade), the party—led by Nahnah's successor Boudjerra Soltani—has been a member of a three-party coalition backing President Abdelaziz Bouteflika.

==== Libya ====
A group of the Muslim Brotherhood came to the Libyan kingdom in the 1950s as refugees escaping crackdown by the Egyptian leader Gamal Abdel Nasser, but it was not able to operate openly until after the First Libyan Civil War. They were viewed negatively by King Idris of Libya who had become increasingly wary of their activities. Muammar Gaddafi forbade all forms of Islamism in Libya and was an archenemy to the Muslim Brotherhood for long time. The group held its first public press conference on 17 November 2011, and on 24 December the Brotherhood announced that it would form the Justice and Construction Party (JCP) and contest the General National Congress elections the following year. The Libyan Muslim Brotherhood has "little history of interactions with the masses."

Despite predictions based on fellow post-Arab Spring nations Tunisia and Egypt that the Brotherhood's party would easily win the elections, it instead came a distant second to the National Forces Alliance, receiving just 10% of the vote and 17 out of 80 party-list seats. Their candidate for Prime Minister, Awad al-Baraasi was also defeated in the first round of voting in September, although he was later made a Deputy Prime Minister under Ali Zeidan. A JCP Congressman, Saleh Essaleh is also the vice speaker of the General National Congress.

The Party of Reform and Development is led by Khaled al-Werchefani, a former member of the Muslim Brotherhood.

Sallabi, the Head of Homeland Party, has close ties to Yusuf al-Qaradawi, the spiritual leader of the international Muslim Brotherhood.

The Muslim Brotherhood in Libya has come under widespread criticism, particularly for their alleged ties with extremist organizations operating in Libya. In fact, the text of the U.S. Congress Muslim Brotherhood Terrorist Designation Act of 2015 directly accuses the militias of the Libyan Muslim Brotherhood of "joining forces with United States designated terrorist organizations, particularly Ansar al-Sharia" who the United States blames for the attack on its compound in Benghazi. There have been similar reports that those tasked with guarding the Benghazi consulate on the night of the assault were connected to the Muslim Brotherhood.

The Libyan Muslim Brotherhood has lost much of its popular support since 2012 as the group was blamed for divisions in the country. Secular Libyan politicians have continued to voice concerns of the Brotherhood's ties to extremist groups. In October 2017, spokesman of the Libyan National Army (LNA) colonel Ahmed Al Masmary claimed that "branches of the Muslim Brotherhood affiliated to al-Qaeda" had joined forces with ISIS in Libya. In the 2014 parliamentary elections, the Muslim Brotherhood won only 25 of the 200 available seats.

==== Mauritania ====
Changes to the demographic and political makeup of Mauritania in the 1970s heavily contributed to the growth of Islamism within Mauritanian society. Periods of severe drought resulted in urbanization, as large numbers of Mauritanians moved from the countryside to the cities, particularly Nouakchott, to escape the drought. This sharp increase in urbanization resulted in new civil associations being formed, and Mauritania's first Islamist organisation, known as Jemaa Islamiyya (Islamic Association) was formed by Mauritanians sympathetic to the Muslim Brotherhood.

There was increased activism relating to the Muslim Brotherhood in the 1980s, partially driven by members of the Egyptian Muslim Brotherhood.

In 2007 the National Rally for Reform and Development, better known as Tewassoul, was legalized as a political party. The party is associated with the Mauritanian branch of the Muslim Brotherhood.

==== Morocco ====
The Justice and Development Party was the largest vote-getter in the 2011 and 2016 parliamentary elections and held the office of Prime Minister from 2011 to 2021. It is historically affiliated with the Muslim Brotherhood, however, despite this, PJD was never an official branch and the party has reportedly "ostentatiously" praised the King of Morocco, while "loudly insisting that it is in no sense whatsoever a Muslim Brotherhood party".

==== Somalia ====
Al-Islah has been described as "a generally nonviolent and modernizing Islamic movement that emphasizes the reformation and revival of Islam to meet the challenges of the modern world", whose "goal is the establishment of an Islamic state" and which "operates primarily in Mogadishu".

==== Sudan ====
An offshoot of the Sudanese branch of the Muslim Brotherhood, the Islamic Charter Front grew during the 1960, with Islamic scholar Hasan al-Turabi becoming its secretary general in 1964. The Islamic Charter Front (ICM) was renamed several times most recently being called the National Islamic Front (NIF). The Muslim Brotherhood/NIF's main objective in Sudan was to Islamize the society "from above" and to institutionalize the Islamic law throughout the country where they succeeded. To that end the party infiltrated the top echelons of the government where the education of party cadre, frequently acquired in the West, made them "indispensable". This approach was described by Turabi himself as the "jurisprudence of necessity".

Meeting resistance from non-Islamists, from already established Muslim organisations, and from non-Muslims in the south, the Sudanese NIF government under Turabi and the NIF organized a coup to overthrow a democratically elected government in 1989, organized the Popular Defense Force which committed "widespread, deliberate and systematic atrocities against hundreds of thousands of southern civilians" in the 1990s. The NIF government also employed "widespread arbitrary and extrajudicial arrest, torture, and execution of labor union officials, military officers, journalists, political figures and civil society leaders".

The NCP was dissolved in the aftermath of the military takeover on 11 April 2019.

=== Europe ===
Muslim Brotherhood organisations in Europe find themselves in different circumstances compared to their counterparts in the Muslim World, as they in Europe operate in societies which do not have a Muslim majority. The first Brotherhood members active in Europe migrated from the Middle East during the late 1950s and early 1960s. Some were in the leadership of the Egyptian Brotherhood who fled the dictatorship of Gamal Abdel Nasser. Most were foreign students who already had Brotherhood sympathies while others were experienced militants. Together they continued their Islamic activities in the destination countries, where Europe's freedoms allowed them to openly conduct activities which had been banned in the Muslim countries of origin.

Student groups affiliated to the MB grew into organizations and they often structured their mosques as community centres. Following al-Banna's organizational model they founded women's groups, think tanks and schools. This growth was funded by both public and private donors in the Arab gulf countries.

By establishing a multitude of organizations devoted to anything from education, financial investments, political lobbying and charity they supported the growing Muslim populations of Europe and sought to shape the direction of Islam in Europe. Thereby the brothers created a de facto branch of the Muslim Brotherhood in every European country. To increase their potential for gaining influence, the organisations established by the MB are often given names which portray a facade of broad representation (e.g. "Muslim association of European Country") or religious moderation (e.g. "Islamic Co-Existence Alliance"). This is in contrast to the views propagated by many speakers at MB events where the Western countries are condemned as being corrupt, unjust and immoral along with a narrative where Muslims are portrayed as better, but beleaguered. On certain issues such as religious freedom, women's rights and homosexuality Brotherhood spokespersons espouse ideas contrary to mainstream European values and basic human rights.

The pan-European umbrella organization of the Brotherhood in Europe is the Federation of Islamic Organizations in Europe which was founded in 1989 and in 2020 changed its name to Council of European Muslims. It has its headquarters a few blocks away from key European Union institutions in Brussels.

==== France ====
The brotherhood's build-up in France started with Union des organisations islamiques en France (UOIF) which later changed its name to Musulmans de France. The organization primarily consisted of foreign students who entered France from Tunisia and Morocco. By 2020, there were 147 mosques and 18 Islamic schools associated with the brotherhood. UOIF has about 50,000 members distributed among 200 member organizations.

The Brotherhood pursues a communitarianist philiosophy and works against Muslims adopting liberal lifestyles and becoming assimilated into French society. In the long term, they aim towards entering politics by increasing the number of Muslims until they can form a political party of their own.

In January 2026, the French National Assembly adopted a non-binding resolution calling on the European Union to assess whether the Muslim Brotherhood should be added to the EU's list of terrorist organisations. The resolution urged EU institutions to examine the movement's activities and networks in Europe, citing concerns about its ideological influence and alleged links to extremist currents. According to various sources, the vote reflected growing scrutiny in France of the Muslim Brotherhood's role in civil society and its perceived challenge to secular and republican values, while government officials emphasised that the measure did not amount to an immediate designation and that any EU-level decision would require a legal assessment and consensus among member states.

==== Germany ====
The Islamic Community of Germany (de: Islamische Gemeinschaft in Deutschland e.V, IGD) being constituent and founding organisation of the MB umbrella organisation FIOE, the MB is active in Germany with the IGD as a proxy. IGD members take care to not publicly declare their affiliation to the MB.

==== Netherlands ====
In March 2026, a majority of members of the Dutch House of Representatives supported a motion calling for a ban on the Muslim Brotherhood and affiliated organisations. The motion was backed by 76 MPs, although some parties, including the CDA, argued that such a ban would be legally difficult because the Muslim Brotherhood is not a formally structured organisation in the Netherlands.

==== Russia ====
The Muslim Brotherhood is banned in Russia as a terrorist organisation.

As affirmed on 14 February 2003 by the decision of the Supreme Court of Russia, the Muslim Brotherhood coordinated the creation of an Islamic organisation called The Supreme Military Majlis ul-Shura of the United Forces of Caucasian Mujahedeen (Russian: Высший военный маджлисуль шура объединённых сил моджахедов Кавказа), led by Ibn Al-Khattab and Basaev; an organisation that committed multiple terror-attack acts in Russia and was allegedly financed by drug trafficking, counterfeiting of coins and racketeering.

==== United Kingdom ====
The Muslim Brotherhood uses London as an administration base.

The first Muslim Brotherhood-affiliated organisations in the UK were founded in the 1960s, which comprised exiles and overseas students. They promoted the works of Indian theologician Abu A'la Mawdudi and represented the Jama'at-e-Islami. In their initial phase they were politically inactive in the UK as they assumed they would return to their home countries and instead focused on recruiting new members and to support the MB in the Arab world.

In the late 1980s and early 1990s, the MB and its associated organisations changed to a new strategy of political activity in western countries with the purpose to promote the MB overseas but also preserve the autonomy of Muslim communities in the UK.

In the 1990s, the MB established publicly visible organisations and ostensibly "national" organisations to further its agenda, but membership in the MB was and remains a secret. The MB dominated the Islamic Society of Britain (ISB), the Muslim Association of Britain (MAB) and founded the Muslim Council of Britain (MCB). MAB became politically active in foreign policy issues such as Palestine and Iraq, while MCB established a dialogue with the then governments.

Since 2001, the ISB has distanced itself from Muslim Brotherhood ideology along with the MCB.

In April 2014, David Cameron, who was the prime minister of the United Kingdom at the time, launched an investigation into the Muslim Brotherhood's activities in the UK and its alleged extremist activities.

In a 2015 government report, the MB was found to not have been linked to terrorist related activity against in the UK and MAB has condemned Al-Qaeda terrorist activity in the UK.

According to later investigations by The Guardian, this report was the result of pressure from the United Arab Emirates. Starting in 2012, the Emirates engaged in targeted lobbying of the British government to push it to take action against the Muslim Brotherhood. In return, the Emirates held out the prospect of investments worth billions. During a conversation with the head of the inquiry commission, a representative of the UAE warned: 'If Britain does not take its allies into account, the difficult discussions we are having will become even more difficult. We are sending a warning signal.

=== Other states ===
==== Australia ====
The Muslim Brotherhood Movement is an Arab street gang in Sydney that uses the same name as the Muslim Brotherhood.

In 2013, members of Sydney's Egyptian community reported that the Muslim Brotherhood had opened an office in Western Sydney, following the election and later overthrowing of Egyptian president Mursi, both of which caused protests in Sydney.

==== Indonesia ====
Several parties and organizations in Indonesia are linked or at least inspired by the Muslim Brotherhood, although none have a formal relationship with the Muslim Brotherhood. One of the Muslim Brotherhood-linked parties is the PKS (Prosperous Justice Party), which gained 6.79% of votes in the 2014 legislative election, down from 7.88% in the 2009 election. The PKS's relationship with the Egyptian Muslim Brotherhood was confirmed by Yusuf al-Qaradawi, a prominent Muslim Brotherhood leader.

==== Malaysia ====
The Malaysian Islamic Party (PAS), the oldest and largest mainstream Islamist party in Malaysia, has close personal and ideological ties with the Egyptian Muslim Brotherhood. Founded in 1951, PAS's founders were exposed to the ideas and teachings while they were studying in Cairo during the 1940s. PAS was the main rival to the Malay nationalist United Malays National Organisation, which dominated Malaysian politics until 2018. Due to changes in political situation created by Pakatan Harapan (PH)'s win in 2018 election, PAS has made a cooperation pact with UMNO in 2019. Together with a former PH component party (BERSATU) both parties ultimately took over the government during 2020–21 Malaysian political crisis. According to the think tank Institute for Democracy and Economic Affairs' CEO Wan Saiful Wan Jan, PAS is regarded by the Muslim Brotherhood as an electorally successful Islamic political party; PAS has governed the state of Kelantan since 2002. PAS representatives are often invited to Muslim Brotherhood speaking engagements overseas. In 2012, PAS president Abdul Hadi Awang spoke alongside Muslim Brotherhood scholar Sheikh Yusuf al-Qaradawi at a speaking event in London. In April 2014, PAS leader Abdul Awang spoke out against Saudi Arabia, Bahrain, and the United Arab Emirates' decision to designate the Muslim Brotherhood as a terrorist organization.

According to Bubalo and Fealy, Angkatan Belia Islam Malaysia (or the Muslim Youth Movement of Malaysia) was inspired or influenced by the Muslim Brotherhood.

==== New Zealand ====
In 2016, Papanui ward candidate John Stringer alleged that a Muslim Brotherhood cell was active in northwestern Christchurch.

==== United States ====
According to a 2004 article by The Washington Post, U.S. Muslim Brotherhood supporters "make up the U.S. Islamic community's most organized force" by running hundreds of mosques and business ventures, promoting civic activities, and setting up American Islamic organizations to defend and promote Islam. In 1963, the U.S. chapter of Muslim Brotherhood was started by activists involved with the Muslim Students Association (MSA). U.S. supporters of the Brotherhood also started other organizations including: North American Islamic Trust in 1971, the Islamic Society of North America in 1981, the American Muslim Council in 1990, the Muslim American Society in 1992 and the International Institute of Islamic Thought in the 1980s. In addition, according to An Explanatory Memorandum on the General Strategic Goal for the Group in North America, the "Understanding of the Role of the Muslim Brotherhood in North America", and a relatively benign goal of the Muslim Brotherhood in North America is identified as the following:

Establishing an effective and a stable Islamic movement led by the Muslim Brotherhood which adopts Muslims' causes domestically and globally, and which works to expand the observant Muslim base, aims at unifying and directing Muslims' efforts, presents Islam as a civilization alternative, and supports the global Islamic state wherever it is.

The process of settlement is a 'Civilization-Jihadist Process' with all the word means. The Ikhwan [Muslim Brotherhood] must understand that their work in America is a kind of grand jihad in eliminating and destroying the Western civilization from within and 'sabotaging' its miserable house by their hands and the hands of the believers so that it is eliminated and God's religion [Islam] is made victorious over all other religions.

During the Holy Land Foundation trial in 2007, several documents pertaining to the Brotherhood were unsuccessful in convincing the courts that the Brotherhood was involved in subversive activities. In one, dated 1984 called "Ikhwan in America" (Brotherhood in America), the author alleges that the activities of the Muslim Brotherhood in the US include going to camps to do weapons training (referred to as special work by the Muslim Brotherhood), as well as engaging in counter-espionage against U.S. government agencies such as the FBI and CIA (referred to as Securing the Group). Another (dated 1991) outlined a strategy for the Muslim Brotherhood in the United States that involved "eliminating and destroying the Western civilization from within".

The documents continue to be widely publicized in American conservative circles.

U.S. Congress attempts to pass legislation criminalizing the group, put forward by the 114th Congress, were defeated. The Bill, called the Muslim Brotherhood Terrorist Designation Act of 2015, was introduced to the Senate Committee on Foreign Relations by Senator Ted Cruz (R-TX). In it the bill states that the Department of State should designate the Muslim Brotherhood as a terrorist organization. If passed, the bill would have required the State Department to report to Congress within 60 days whether or not the group fits the criteria, and if it did not, to state which specific criteria it had not met.

This bill came after a handful of foreign countries made similar moves in recent years including Egypt, Russia, Saudi Arabia, and others, and after, according to Cruz, recent evidence emerged suggesting that the group supports terrorism. The senator further alleged that the group's stated goal is to wage violent jihad against its enemies, which includes the United States, and the fact that the Obama administration has listed numerous group members on its terror list. Cruz further stated that the bill would "reject the fantasy that [the] parent institution [of the Muslim Brotherhood] is a political entity that is somehow separate from these violent activities".

The bill identifies three Muslim Brotherhood entities in the U.S. including the Council on American–Islamic Relations (CAIR), a non-profit group denounced by the UAE for its MB ties. The other two entities are the Islamic Society of North America (ISNA) and the North American Islamic Trust (NAIT).

Conservatives in the Congress believe that the group is a breeding ground for radical Islam. Previous attempts were made in the previous year by Representative Michele Bachmann (R-MN), but it failed largely due to her allegation that Huma Abedin, Hillary Clinton's aide, had links to the organization, a statement which was dismissed by establishment Democrats and Republicans.

In February 2016, the House Judiciary Committee approved the legislation in a 17 to 10 vote, which if enacted could increase grounds for enforcing criminal penalties and give permission to the Secretary of Treasury to block financial transactions and freeze assets of anyone who has showed material support for the group. Scholars against this classification claim that the group simply promotes Islamism, or the belief that society should be governed according to Islamic values and Sharia law.

Past U.S. presidential administrations have examined whether to designate the Muslim Brotherhood as a Foreign Terrorist Organization and have decided not to do so. During the George W. Bush administration, the U.S. government investigated the Brotherhood and associated Islamist groups, but "after years of investigations, ... the U.S. and other governments, including Switzerland's, closed investigations of the Brotherhood leaders and financial group for lack of evidence, and removed most of the leaders from sanctions lists." The Obama administration was also pressured to designate the Brotherhood as a terrorist organization, but did not do so. During the first Donald Trump administration, there were serious steps towards designating the Muslim Brotherhood as a terrorist organization.

In November 2025 a new report was presented to members of Congress, senior diplomats, policy experts and leading scholars in a Washington event. According to ISGAP, the Muslim Brotherhood is operating by a long, 100-year plan intended to spread its influence inside Western governments, schools, and other institutions, while holding beliefs that go against democratic values. The reports that is based on internal documents and network studies, shows clear connections, ideas, organization, and money transfers between the Brotherhood, Hamas, and other groups. The report also shows that Qatar is one of the organization's main supporters.

== Beliefs ==
The Brotherhood's English-language website describes its principles as including firstly the introduction of the Islamic Sharia as "the basis for controlling the affairs of state and society" and secondly, working to unify "Islamic countries and states, mainly among the Arab states, and liberate them from foreign imperialism". The Brotherhood is heavily influenced by the early Salafiyya movement and regularly advocates Salafi revivalist themes that address the contemporary challenges faced by Muslims, calling for the establishment of an Islamic state through implementation of the Shari'ah and Jihad against disbelievers. Science and technology should be harnessed through Islamic means to revive the Islamic prowess and Jihad should be waged personally as well as communally to bring forth effective political transformations. The Brotherhood share common creedal beliefs with other Salafiyya movements, such as i) strict monotheism with regard to Divine attributes, ii) purifying Islam from accretions and folk practices associated with Sufism, and iii) focusing on the moral integrity of individuals through Tazkiyya. Activist Salafis have a historical tradition of influential political activism across the various branches and affiliates of the Muslim Brotherhood movement.

Its founder, Hassan Al-Banna, was influenced by pan-Islamic scholars Muhammad Abduh and Rashid Rida (who attacked the taqlid of the official `ulama, and he insisted that only the Quran and the best-attested hadiths should be sources of the Sharia), with the group structure and approach being influenced by Sufism. However, Al-Banna avoided controversies over doctrine and would distance himself from the anti-Sufi dogmas of Rashid Rida. As a teen, Al-Banna had been initiated into the Hasafi branch of Shadhiliyya order and was not hostile to various Sufi practices condemned as aspects of polytheism by Rida. While Al-Banna agreed with Rida on the need to purify religious practices of illegitimate innovations, he saw nothing wrong with visits to the graves of Awliyaa (saints) so long as one did not seek their intercession. He would later declare the Hasafiyya society as a precursor to the Muslim Brotherhood; while also acknowledging his debt to the Salafiyya tradition.

Al-Banna downplayed doctrinal differences between schools (acknowledging Shi'ism as a valid "fifth school", while declaring Ahmadiyya and the Islam-related Baháʼí and Druze religions to be takfir) emphasizing the political importance of worldwide unity of the ummah. In the few occasions a mature Al-Banna did address theology, he espoused Salafi views by expressing his dislike of Ilm al-Kalam, philosophy, etc. and seeking his preference to draw directly from Qur'an, Sunnah and Salaf. However he would not openly side with Atharis against the Ash'aris, instead lumping all the medieval theological debates as irrelevant. While his religious activism resembled Ibn Taymiyya, Banna's approach to theological prioritisation was imparted through Sufi-inspired Ghazalian expressions. After the creation of Muslim Brotherhood organisation, Al-Banna would not maintain formal affiliations with Sufi orders. While the Brothers acknowledged the validity of the true spiritual Tasawwuf, they would be critical of institutionalised Sufi orders; which in their view led to divisions amongst the Muslims.

As Islamic Modernist beliefs were co-opted by secularist rulers and official ulama, the Brotherhood has become traditionalist and conservative, "being the only available outlet for those whose religious and cultural sensibilities had been outraged by the impact of Westernization". Al-Banna believed the Quran and Sunnah constitute a perfect way of life and social and political organization that God has set out for man. Islamic governments must be based on this system and eventually unified in a Caliphate. The Muslim Brotherhood's goal, as stated by its founder al-Banna was to drive out British colonial and other Western influences, reclaim Islam's manifest destiny—an empire, stretching from Spain to Indonesia. The Brotherhood preaches that Islam will bring social justice, the eradication of poverty, corruption and sinful behavior, and political freedom (to the extent allowed by the laws of Islam). Blended with methods of modern social sciences, some key thinkers of Brotherhood have also contemplated the Islamic perspective on bureaucratic effectiveness, mapping out solutions to problems of formalism and irresponsiveness to public concerns in public administration, which pertains to the pro-democratic tenets of Muslim Brotherhood. Such variations of thoughts have also purportedly negated the realities of contemporary Muslim countries as their authors have proclaimed.

On the issue of women and gender the Muslim Brotherhood interprets Islam conservatively. Its founder called for "a campaign against ostentation in dress and loose behavior", "segregation of male and female students", a separate curriculum for girls, and "the prohibition of dancing and other such pastimes ... "

There have been breakaway groups from the movement, including the al-Jama'a al-Islamiyya and Takfir wal-Hijra. Prominent figures of the Brotherhood include Sayyid Qutb, a highly influential thinker of Islamism, and the author of Milestones. Osama bin Laden criticized the Brotherhood, and accused it of betraying jihad and the ideals of Qutb.

=== Stance on democracy, civil rights and secularism ===
According to Deputy of the Chairman of the Muslim Brotherhood, Dr. Mohamed El-Sayed Habib, the Muslim Brotherhood believes in implementing various political reforms for enabling freedom of assembly, press freedoms, democracy, political pluralism, peaceful transition of power, etc.

We believe that the political reform is the true and natural gateway for all other kinds of reform. We have announced our acceptance of democracy that acknowledges political pluralism, the peaceful rotation of power and the fact that the nation is the source of all powers. As we see it, political reform includes the termination of the state of emergency, restoring public freedoms, including the right to establish political parties, whatever their tendencies may be, and the freedom of the press, freedom of criticism and thought, freedom of peaceful demonstrations, freedom of assembly, etc. It also includes the dismantling of all exceptional courts and the annulment of all exceptional laws, establishing the independence of the judiciary, enabling the judiciary to fully and truly supervise general elections so as to ensure that they authentically express people's will, removing all obstacles that restrict the functioning of civil society organizations, etc.

However, the Brotherhood is opposed to secularism and seeks the implementation of Shari'a (Islamic law) as the basis of Egyptian legal system and insists on complying the political system with Islamic legal precepts. When asked whether the Muslim Brotherhood seeks to establish a religious theocracy; the same spokesperson replied:

This concern stems from a wrong understanding of the nature of Islam. To those who speak about a religious state, in the same ecclesiastical meaning given to it in Europe in the Middle Ages, when the church had hegemony over a State's authorities, we wish to say that the issue here is completely different. The Muslim Brotherhood has gone through the latest legislative elections on the basis of a clear-cut program under the slogan "Islam is the Solution", given the fact that Islam, as Imam el-Banna said, is a comprehensive program that encompasses all aspects of life: it is a state and a country, a government and people, ethics and power, mercy and justice, culture and law, science and justice, resources and wealth, defense and advocacy, an army and an idea, a true belief and correct acts of worship.

=== Mottos ===
The Brotherhood's "most frequently used slogan" (according to the BBC) is "Islam is the Solution" (الإسلام هو الحل). According to academic Khalil Yusuf, its motto "was traditionally" "Believers are but Brothers."

Hasan Al-Banna presented the reform programme of the Muslim Brothers as one that sought to encompass every sphere of life; defining the movement as:

a Salafiyya message, a Sunni way, a Sufi truth, a political organization, an athletic group, a cultural-educational union, an economic company, and a social idea

== Strategy and organization ==
The Muslim Brothers consider their movement to be the practical extension of the pan-Islamist movement championed by Jamal al-Din al-Afghani, Muhammad Abduh, and Rashid Rida. Afghani is regarded as the 'caller' or 'announcer' (mu'adhdhin, sarkha); Rida as the 'archivist' or 'historian' (sijal, mu'arrikh) and Banna was seen as the 'builder' (bani) of the Islamic renaissance movement. Afghani was considered as the spiritual father of the movement and as a fiery defender of the faith against both internal corruption and external encroachment. 'Abduh was viewed as "a well-meaning shaykh who inspired reforms in the Azhar". The methodology of the Brotherhood was characterised by the scholarly orthodoxy and conservatism of Muhammad Rashid Rida. Like Rida, Banna too advocated a conservative revival to values of early Muslim generations and viewed Islam to be a comprehensive faith, outlining it as: "a faith and a ritual, a nation (watan) and a nationality, a religion and a state, spirit and deed, holy text and sword". The Muslim Brotherhood movement sought the re-establishment of a World Islamic Caliphate which was envisaged to come through several Islamic national states, united in a league, and appointing a single leader to rule over them after Shura (consultation). This vision was based upon the Islamic state doctrines of Muhammad Rashid Rida. However, Al-Banna prioritised the immediate form of governance that the Brotherhood had to establish and did not advocate the radical overthrow of these structures, instead preferring gradualism. He favored a constitutional government with a representative parliamentary system that implemented Islamic law (Sharia). The aim for Caliphate was more of an utopian ideal than an explicit and practical political goal which was the construction of Islamic national units which would then bond together towards a global Islamic polity.

The Muslim Brotherhood's position on political participation varied according to the "domestic situation" of each branch, rather than ideology. For many years its stance was "collaborationist" in Kuwait and Jordan; for "pacific opposition" in Egypt; "armed opposition" in Libya and Syria. It was written on 1 December 1982, by Yusuf al-Qaradawi at the culmination of a series of two meetings held in 1977 and 1982 in Lugano, Switzerland. The treaty instructs Brotherhood members to show "flexibility" when it comes to their activity outside the Islamic world, encouraging them to temporarily adopt Western values without deviating from their "basic [Islamic] principles."

The Muslim Brotherhood is a transnational organization as opposed to a political party, but its members have created political parties in several countries, such as the Islamic Action Front in Jordan, Hamas in Gaza and the West Bank, and the former Freedom and Justice Party in Egypt. These parties are staffed by Brotherhood members, but are otherwise kept independent from the Muslim Brotherhood to some degree, unlike Hizb ut-Tahrir, which is highly centralized. The Brotherhood has been described as a "combination of neo-Sufic tariqa" (with al-Banna as the original murshid i.e., guide of the tariqa) "and a political party". The Egyptian Brotherhood has a pyramidal structure with "families" (or usra, which consists of four to five people and is headed by a naqib, or "captain") at the bottom, "clans" above them, "groups" above clans and "battalions" or "phalanxes" above groups. Potential Brethren start out as Muhib or "lovers", and if approved move up to become a muayyad, or "supporter", then to muntasib or "affiliated", (who are nonvoting members). If a muntasib "satisfies his monitors", he is promoted to muntazim, or "organizer", before advancing to the final level—ach 'amal, or "working brother". With this slow careful advancement, the loyalty of potential members can be "closely probed" and obedience to orders assured.

At the top of the hierarchy is the Guidance Office (Maktab al-Irshad), and immediately below it is the Shura Council. Orders are passed down through a chain of command:

- The Shura Council has the duties of planning, charting general policies and programs that achieve the goal of the Group. It is composed of roughly 100 Muslim Brothers. Important decisions, such as whether to participate in elections, are debated and voted on within the Shura Council and then executed by the Guidance Office. Its resolutions are binding to the Group and only the General Organizational Conference can modify or annul them and the Shura Office has also the right to modify or annul resolutions of the Executive Office. It follows the implementation of the Group's policies and programs. It directs the Executive Office and it forms dedicated branch committees to assist in that.
- Executive Office or Guidance Office (Maktab al-Irshad), which is composed of approximately 15 longtime Muslim Brothers and headed by the supreme guide or General Masul (murshid) Each member of the Guidance Office oversees a different portfolio, such as university recruitment, education, or politics. Guidance Office members are elected by the Shura Council. Divisions of the Guidance/Executive Office include:
  - Executive leadership
  - Organizational office
  - Secretariat general
  - Educational office
  - Political office
  - Sisters office

The Muslim Brotherhood aimed to build a transnational organization. In the 1940s, the Egyptian Brotherhood organized a "section for Liaison with the Islamic World" endowed with nine committees. Groups were founded in Lebanon (1936), in Syria (1937), and Transjordan (1946). It also recruited members among the foreign students who lived in Cairo where its headquarters became a center and a meeting place for representatives from the whole Muslim world.

In each country with an MB there is a Branch committee with a Masul (leader) appointed by the General Executive leadership with essentially the same Branch-divisions as the Executive office. "Properly speaking" Brotherhood branches exist only in Arab countries of the Middle East where they are "in theory" subordinate to the Egyptian General Guide. Beyond that the Brotherhood sponsors national organizations in countries like Tunisia (Ennahda Movement), Morocco (Justice and Charity party), Algeria (Movement of Society for Peace). Outside the Arab world it also has influence, with former president of Afghanistan, Burhanuddin Rabbani, having adopted MB ideas during his studies at Al-Azhar University, and many similarities between mujahideen groups in Afghanistan and Arab MBs. Angkatan Belia Islam Malaysia in Malaysia is close to the Brotherhood. According to scholar Olivier Roy, as of 1994 "an international agency" of the Brotherhood "assures the cooperation of the ensemble" of its national organizations. The agency's "composition is not well known, but the Egyptians maintain a dominant position".

== Criticism ==
The Brotherhood was criticised by Ayman al-Zawahiri, then the Deputy Emir of al-Qaeda, in 2007 for its refusal to advocate the violent overthrow of the Mubarak government. Essam el-Erian, a top Egyptian Muslim Brotherhood figure, denounced the al-Qaeda leader: "Zawahiri's policy and preaching bore dangerous fruit and had a negative impact on Islam and Islamic movements across the world".

Dubai police chief Dhahi Khalfan accused Egypt's Muslim Brotherhood of an alleged plot to overthrow the UAE government. He referred to the Muslim Brotherhood as "dictators" who want "Islamist rule in all the Gulf States".

Numerous officials and reporters question the sincerity of the Muslim Brotherhood's pronouncements. These critics include Juan Zarate, former U.S. White House counterterrorism chief (quoted in the conservative publication, FrontPage Magazine): "The Muslim Brotherhood is a group that worries us not because it deals with philosophical or ideological ideas but because it defends the use of violence against civilians".

Miles Axe Copeland Jr., a prominent U.S. Central Intelligence Agency (CIA) operative who was one of the founding members of the Office of Strategic Services (OSS) under William Donovan, divulged the confessions of numerous members of the Muslim Brotherhood that resulted from the harsh interrogations done on them by Egyptian president Gamal Abdel Nasser, for their alleged involvement in the assassination attempt made against him (an assassination attempt that many believe was staged by Nasser himself). They revealed that the Muslim Brotherhood was merely a "guild" that fulfilled the goals of western interests: "Nor was that all. Sound beatings of the Moslem Brotherhood organizers who had been arrested revealed that the organization had been thoroughly penetrated, at the top, by the British, American, French and Soviet intelligence services, any one of which could either make active use of it or blow it up, whichever best suited its purposes. Important lesson: fanaticism is no insurance against corruption; indeed, the two are highly compatible".

Former U.S. Middle East peace envoy Dennis Ross told Asharq Alawsat newspaper that the Muslim Brotherhood is a global, not a local organization, governed by a Shura (Consultative) Council, which rejects cessation of violence in Israel, and supports violence to achieve its political objectives elsewhere too.

Sarah Mousa of Al Jazeera reported on the Muslim Brotherhood's highly improbable claim that opposition leader and Nobel Peace Prize laureate Mohamed ElBaradei (who has had a "rocky" relationship with the US) was "an American agent", and observed that the since-defunct Muslim Brotherhood-controlled Shura Council's support of the slander demonstrated a lack of commitment to democracy.

Scholar Carrie Rosefsky Wickham finds official Brotherhood documents ambiguous on the issue of democracy: "This raises the question of whether the Brotherhood is supporting a transition to democracy as an end in itself or as a first step toward the ultimate establishment of a political system based not on the preferences of the Egyptian people but the will of God as they understand it".

=== Status of non-Muslims ===
In 1997, Muslim Brotherhood Supreme Guide Mustafa Mashhur told journalist Khalid Daoud that he thought Egypt's Coptic Christians and Orthodox Jews should pay the long-abandoned jizya poll tax, levied on non-Muslims in exchange for protection from the state, rationalized by the fact that non-Muslims are exempt from military service while it is compulsory for Muslims. He went on to say, "we do not mind having Christian members in the People's Assembly. ... [T]he top officials, especially in the army, should be Muslims since we are a Muslim country. ... This is necessary because when a Christian country attacks the Muslim country and the army has Christian elements, they can facilitate our defeat by the enemy". According to The Guardian newspaper, the proposal caused an "uproar" among Egypt's 16 million Coptic Christians and "the movement later backtracked".

=== Response to criticisms ===
According to authors writing in the Council on Foreign Relations magazine Foreign Affairs: "At various times in its history, the group has used or supported violence and has been repeatedly banned in Egypt for attempting to overthrow Cairo's secular government. Since the 1970s, however, the Egyptian Brotherhood has disavowed violence and sought to participate in Egyptian politics". Jeremy Bowen, the Middle East editor for the BBC, called it "conservative and non-violent". The Brotherhood "has condemned" terrorism and the 9/11 attacks.

The Brotherhood itself denounces the "catchy and effective terms and phrases" like "fundamentalist" and "political Islam" which it claims are used by "Western media" to pigeonhole the group, and points to its "15 Principles" for an Egyptian National Charter, including "freedom of personal conviction ... opinion ... forming political parties ... public gatherings ... free and fair elections ..."

Similarly, some analysts maintain that whatever the source of modern Jihadi terrorism and the actions and words of some rogue members, the Brotherhood now has little in common with radical Islamists and modern jihadists who often condemn the Brotherhood as too moderate. They also deny the existence of any centralized and secretive global Muslim Brotherhood leadership. Some claim that the origins of modern Muslim terrorism are found in Wahhabi ideology, not that of the Muslim Brotherhood.

According to anthropologist Scott Atran, the influence of the Muslim Brotherhood even in Egypt has been overstated by Western commentators. He estimates that it can count on only 100,000 militants (out of some 600,000 dues paying members) in a population of more than 80 million, and that such support as it does have among Egyptians—an often cited figure is 20 percent to 30 percent—is less a matter of true attachment than an accident of circumstance: secular opposition groups that might have countered it were suppressed for many decades, but in driving the Egyptian revolution of 2011, a more youthful constellation of secular movements has emerged to threaten the Muslim Brotherhood's dominance of the political opposition. This has not yet been the case, however, as evidenced by the Brotherhood's strong showing in national elections. Polls also indicate that a majority of Egyptians and other Arab nations endorse laws based on "Sharia".

== Foreign relations ==
Countries that ban Muslim Brotherhood, as of August 2021

On 29 June 2011, as the Brotherhood's political power became more apparent and solidified following the Egyptian revolution of 2011, the United States announced that it would reopen formal diplomatic channels with the group, with whom it had suspended communication as a result of suspected terrorist activity. The next day, the Brotherhood's leadership announced that they welcomed the diplomatic overture.

In September 2014, Brotherhood leaders were expelled from Qatar. The New York Times reported: "Although the Brotherhood's views are not nearly as conservative as the puritanical, authoritarian version of Islamic law enforced in Saudi Arabia, the Saudis and other gulf monarchies fear the group because of its broad organization, its mainstream appeal and its calls for elections".

=== Designation as a terrorist organization ===
Countries and organizations below have listed the Muslim Brotherhood as a terrorist organization.

- Russia – 12 February 2003
- Kazakhstan – 15 March 2005
- Tajikistan – 30 March 2006
- CSTO (Collective Security Treaty Organization) – 7 May 2009
- Egypt – 25 December 2013
- Saudi Arabia – 7 March 2014
- Bahrain – 21 March 2014
- United Arab Emirates – 15 November 2014
- Argentina (three branches)
- Bahrain
- Germany (affiliated militant groups only)
- Kenya
- United States (four branches)
- Libya's Tobruk-based House of Representatives also designated the Muslim Brotherhood as a terrorist group on 14 May 2019.

==== Formerly ====
- Ba'athist Syria – 21 October 2013 (until 2024)

==== United States ====
In January 2017, during his confirmation hearing, the former U.S. Secretary of State, Rex Tillerson, referred to the Muslim Brotherhood, along with Al-Qaeda, as an agent of radical Islam—a characterization that Human Rights Watch member Sarah Leah Whitson criticized on social media, disseminating a statement from the HRW Washington director saying that the conflation of the group with violent extremists was inaccurate. In February 2017, The New York Times reported that the first administration of U.S. president Donald Trump was considering an order designating the Muslim Brotherhood as a foreign terrorist organization. On 24 November 2025, the second Trump administration started the process of designating branches of the Muslim Brotherhood as terrorist organizations. These included the Jordanian branch which it accused of providing "material support" to Hamas, the Islamic Group in Lebanon which it said sided with Hamas and Hezbollah in their war against Israel, and the Egyptian branch of the Muslim Brotherhood, claiming one of its leaders "called for violent attacks against United States partners and interests" during the Gaza war. On 24 November 2025, a Trump administration executive order began the process to designate the Muslim Brotherhood in Egypt, Lebanon, and Jordan as foreign terrorist organizations and specially designated global terrorists. On 18 November 2025, Texas designated the Muslim Brotherhood as a terrorist organization and as a transnational criminal organization as well as the Council on American–Islamic Relations (CAIR). On 9 December 2025, Florida Governor Ron DeSantis designated the Muslim Brotherhood along with CAIR as "foreign terrorist organizations."

On 13 January 2026, the United States government designated three national branches of the Muslim Brotherhood as terrorist organizations under U.S. counterterrorism laws. The Egyptian and Jordanian branches were listed as Specially Designated Global Terrorists, while the Lebanese branch, known as al-Jamaa al-Islamiyah, was designated both as a Foreign Terrorist Organization and a Specially Designated Global Terrorist entity. The U.S. Treasury and State Departments justified the designations by asserting that the groups had provided material support to violent actors, including alleged support for the Palestinian militant group Hamas and other activities that undermined regional stability. Sanctions imposed on these organizations and their leaders include asset freezes and restrictions on financial transactions. The designations drew denunciations from the targeted groups, some of which indicated plans to challenge the classifications. In March 2026, the U.S. Department of State said that it would designate the Sudanese Muslim Brotherhood as a terrorist organization due to its alleged ties to the Islamic Revolutionary Guard Corps of Iran.

==== Outside the Middle East ====
In February 2003, the Supreme Court of Russia banned the Muslim Brotherhood, labelling it as a terrorist organization, and accusing the group of supporting Islamist rebels who want to create an Islamic state in the North Caucasus.

In an interview published on 1 March 2014, the Aga Khan IV spoke well of the Muslim Brotherhood – praising the way they "act in civil society".

The Muslim Brotherhood was criticized by Secretary Tillerson. The terrorist designation for the Muslim Brotherhood is opposed by Human Rights Watch and The New York Times, both liberal-leaning institutions. The potential terrorist designation was criticized, in particular, by Human Rights Watch member Laura Pitter. The New York Times set forth its opposition in an editorial that claimed that the Muslim Brotherhood is a collection of movements, and argued that the organization as a whole does not merit the terrorist designation: "While the Brotherhood calls for a society governed by Islamic law, it renounced violence decades ago, has supported elections and has become a political and social organization". The designation of the Muslim Brotherhood as a terrorist organization is opposed by the Brennan Center for Justice, Amnesty International, Human Rights Watch, Council on American-Islamic Relations and American Civil Liberties Union.

Human Rights Watch and its director Kenneth Roth oppose proposals to designate the Muslim Brotherhood as a terrorist organization.

Gehad El-Haddad, a Muslim Brotherhood member, denied that terrorism was practiced by the Muslim Brotherhood in an editorial published by The New York Times.

In a report by the Carnegie Middle East Center, Nathan Brown and Michele Dunne argued that "designating the Muslim Brotherhood a foreign terrorist organization may actually backfire," writing: "The sweeping measure to declare the Brotherhood a foreign terrorist organization now being contemplated not only does not accord with the facts, but is also more likely to undermine than achieve its ostensible purpose and could result in collateral damage affecting other U.S. policy goals. The greatest damage might be in the realm of public diplomacy, as using a broad brush to paint all Muslim Brotherhood organizations as terrorists would be understood by many Muslims around the world as a declaration of war against non-violent political Islamists—and indeed against Islam itself."

The Muslim Brotherhood in Egypt avoids directly implicating itself materially in terrorism while it supports terrorism with words and encourages it, according to WINEP fellow Eric Trager, who advocated pushing them into a corner instead of designating them due to issues with materially connecting them to terrorism other than with their words.

The editorial boards of The New York Times and The Washington Post oppose designation of the group as a terrorist organization.

Civil rights lawyer and adjunct professor of law Arjun Singh Sethi wrote that the push to designate the Muslim Brotherhood as a terrorist organization was based on anti-Islamic conspiracy theories, noting that "Two previous U.S. administrations concluded that it does not engage in terrorism, as did a recent report by the British government."

Ishaan Tharoor of The Washington Post condemned the movement to designate the Brotherhood as a terrorist group.

A Central Intelligence Agency (CIA) intelligence report from January 2017 warned that designation of the Brotherhood as a terrorist organization "may fuel extremism" and harm relations with U.S. allies. The report noted that the Brotherhood had "rejected violence as a matter of official policy and opposed al-Qa'ida and ISIS" and that while "a minority of MB [Muslim Brotherhood] members have engaged in violence, most often in response to harsh regime repression, perceived foreign occupation, or civil conflicts", designation of the organization as a terrorist group would prompt concern from U.S. allies in the Middle East "that such a step could destabilize their internal politics, feed extremist narratives, and anger Muslims worldwide." The CIA analysis stated: "MB groups enjoy widespread support across the Near East-North Africa region and many Arabs and Muslims worldwide would view an MB designation as an affront to their core religious and societal values. Moreover, a US designation would probably weaken MB leaders' arguments against violence and provide ISIS and al-Qa'ida additional grist for propaganda to win followers and support, particularly for attacks against US interests."

An article in The Atlantic against designating the Muslim Brotherhood as a terrorist organization was written by Shadi Hamid.

In September 2025, Kenya designated the Muslim Brotherhood as a terrorist organization.

On 16 January 2026, Argentina designated the Egyptian, Jordanian, and Lebanese branches of the Muslim Brotherhood as terrorist organizations, three days after the United States made similar designations of the same branches.

=== Relationship to diplomatic crises in Qatar ===
Qatar's relationship with Muslim Brotherhood has been a persistent point of contention between Qatar and other Arab states, including Saudi Arabia, the United Arab Emirates (UAE), Bahrain, and Egypt, which view the Brotherhood as a serious threat to social stability in those countries.

Following the overthrow of Mohamed Morsi in July 2013, Qatar allowed some Brotherhood members who fled Egypt to live in the country. The Qatar-based Al Jazeera "housed them in a five-star Doha hotel and granted them regular airtime for promoting their cause"; the station also broadcast protests against the post-Brotherhood authorities in Egypt by the Brotherhood, "and in some cases allegedly paid Muslim Brothers for the footage." Saudi Arabia, the UAE, and Bahrain said that Qatar had violated the Gulf Cooperation Council rule against interference in the internal affairs of other members, and in March 2014 all three countries withdrew their ambassadors from Qatar. After two months of diplomatic tensions the issue was resolved, with Brotherhood leaders departing from Doha later in 2014.

However, "from Saudi Arabia, Bahrain, and the UAE's standpoint, Qatar never lived up to the 2014 agreement and continued to serve as the nexus of the Brotherhood's regional networks." This led to the 2017 Qatar diplomatic crisis, which is viewed as being precipitated in large part by a conflict over the Muslim Brotherhood. Saudi Arabia, the UAE, Bahrain, and Egypt made 13 demands of the government of Qatar, six of which reflect the group's opposition to Qatar's relationship with the Muslim Brotherhood and demand that the country cut ties to the Brotherhood.

== See also ==
- Politics of Egypt
- Islamism
- List of designated terrorist groups
- Al-Ahbash
- Taqi al-Din al-Nabhani
- Sayyid Qutb
- Hassan al-Banna
- Yusuf al-Qaradawi
- Misr 25
- Project Endgame
