= Egypt–Kosovo relations =

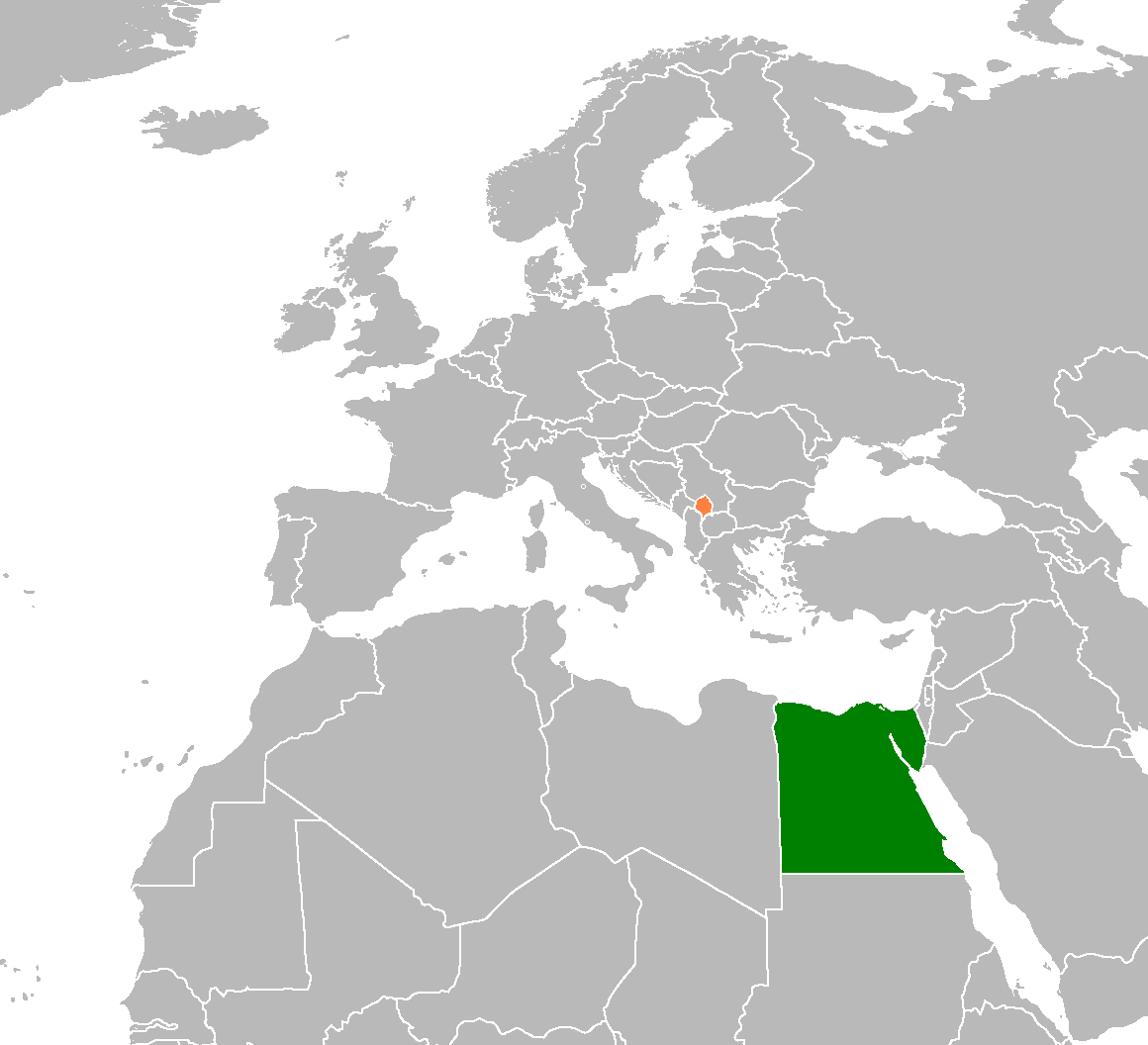
- Egypt: Kosovo

Diplomatic mission
- none: Liaison Office of Kosovo, Cairo

Envoy
- none: Ambassador Beqir Ismaili

Egypt–Kosovo relations are foreign relations between Egypt and Kosovo.

Egypt recognised the Kosovo as an independent state on 26 June 2013. Kosovo has a liaison office in Cairo.

== Egypt's reaction to the 2008 Kosovo declaration of independence ==
Kosovo's declaration of independence from Serbia was enacted on Sunday, 17 February 2008 by a unanimous vote of the Assembly of Kosovo. All 11 representatives of the Serb minority boycotted the proceedings. International reaction was mixed, and the world community continues to be divided on the issue of the international recognition of Kosovo. Egypt's reaction to the 2008 Kosovo declaration of independence was mixed. Before the 2011 Egyptian revolution it was opposed to Kosovo's independence, but after the revolution it is more supportive of it.

=== 2008 ===
Soon after Kosovo's declaration of independence, an Egyptian Foreign Ministry spokesman urged the parties to abide by international law and support regional stability, but did not say whether Egypt would recognise Kosovo.

At the summit of the OIC on 10 March 2008, Egypt opposed adoption of the document, proposed by Turkey, that would lend support to Kosovo's declaration of independence.

On 19 June 2008, during the meeting of the OIC, Egypt was among countries that opposed the recognition of Kosovo as an independent country.

On 29 September 2008, Foreign Minister Ahmed Aboul Gheit said that his government was closely following all developments in Kosovo and the region, and that his country would act at the right time regarding the issue of the recognition of Kosovo. In an interview with Večernje novosti on 29 September 2008, the Ambassador of Egypt to Serbia, Adel Ahmed Naguib, stated that Egypt respects Serbia's sovereignty and territorial integrity, and believes that an agreement should be found to satisfy both sides, for a win-win outcome.

In early November 2008, presidential adviser and former deputy foreign minister, Abdullah el-Esha'al stated "that recognition of Kosovo independence will assertively come from Egypt very soon, because we are keen to contribute to peace and stability to this part of the world, and now we are very well informed about your history and self-determination endeavors to build your independent state".

In late November 2008, however, Egypt blocked Kosovo's delegation from taking part in the OIC's second Ministerial Conference on Women to be held in Cairo. Even though the OIC had previously allowed Kosovo to participate with guest status on the request of Albania, Egypt objected and barred the delegation from talks.

=== 2009 ===
On 1 April 2009, then President Hosni Mubarak assured Serbian President Boris Tadić that Egypt will not recognise Kosovo, according to Tadić. The two leaders agreed that all global problems should be resolved within the UN.

At a meeting on 26 May 2009 between the Kosovan Foreign Minister, Skënder Hyseni, and Maged A. Abdelaziz, the representative of Egypt to the UN, Mr. Abdelaziz reportedly said that Egypt is closely tracking developments, and that Egypt will sooner or later join the countries that have recognised Kosovo.

=== 2010 ===
On 22 March 2010, the Egyptian Foreign Ministry announced that Egypt will not recognise Kosovo as an independent state before the ICJ gives its advisory opinion on the legality of Kosovo's unilaterally proclaimed independence.

In a 29 September 2010 meeting with Skënder Hyseni, Egypt's Minister of Foreign Affairs, Ahmed Aboul Gheit, Mr. Gheit said that Egypt is considering Kosovo's request for recognition and will make a decision at the right time. He explained that the delay in recognition was not due to Kosovo, but for other reasons.

=== 2011 ===
On 11 April 2011, after the Egyptian revolution had resulted in the installment of temporary military rule in place of the previous government, the Egyptian Deputy Foreign Minister, Ahmed Amin Fathallah, said that Egypt is taking practical steps towards recognising Kosovo.

On 6 September 2011, Egypt's Foreign Minister Mohamed Kamel Amr said that even with a new government, Egypt would not change its position on recognising Kosovo.

On 20 September 2011, the Secretariat of the Revolutionary Council of Egypt announced that it recognised Kosovo's independence, but that this was not a recognition by the current interim government.

=== 2012 ===
In a February 2012 meeting between the President of Kosovo, Atifete Jahjaga, and the Minister of Foreign Affairs of Egypt, Mohamed Kamel Amr, Amr praised the progress achieved in Kosovo and said that Egypt is following with interest the developments in Kosovo and is keen to establish close relations of cooperation between the two countries.

In March 2012, the Foreign Relations Committee of the People's Assembly of Egypt (the lower house of the Parliament of Egypt) sent a recommendation to the Minister of Foreign Affairs, Mohamed Kamel Amr, requesting the recognition of Kosovo.

In April 2012 the Deputy Minister of Foreign Affairs of Kosovo, Ibrahim Gashi was received by the Deputy Foreign Minister of Egypt, Osama Tawfik Badr, Badr suggested to Deputy Minister Gashi that Egypt will quickly, as soon as it concludes the creation of new institutions, take a decision to recognise Kosovo. The people and institutions of Egypt, Badr said are and will be supportive of Kosovo.

During his June 2012 campaign, Egyptian President-elect Mohamed Morsi stated that he supports the freedom of the people of Kosovo and appreciates their sacrifices for freedom and independence. Morsi said that the Egyptian nation has always supported the independence of Kosovo and if he were to be elected President, the decision to recognise Kosovo would follow very soon.

In September 2012, Ahmed Fahmy, the chairman of Egypt's Shura Council (the upper house of the parliament), said that Egypt's people have expressed hope that decision on recognition will soon be made by the new Egyptian government. He said that Egypt stands in solidarity with the Kosovan people who suffered to attain their freedom. Egypt's Minister of Parliamentary Affairs, Muhammad Mahsub, said that he was aware of the delay in the recognition of Kosovo, urging Kosovo to understand the period in which Egypt is going through. He said that Egyptian institutions are committed to the completion of the transition, and the adoption of the constitution and democratic processes. He expressed hope that at the end of these processes the recognition of Kosovo will come naturally. Hossam Ghariani, president of Egypt's National Council for Human Rights and chairman of the Constituent Assembly, expressed hope that Kosovo would soon be a member of the United Nations.

On 15 November 2012 in a visit to Kosovo, Ahmed Fahmy Ahmed stated that "The issue of recognition is on the agenda, and Kosovo deserves its independence from its historical past"

=== 2013 ===
During a visit to Egypt by Minister of Foreign Affairs of the Republic of Kosovo Enver Hoxhaj in January, Amr stated that “with regard to Egypt’s recognition of Kosovo, I can say that we are examining this very seriously and we hope that very soon we will take a decision at the right time", while Essam Al-Haddad, the Assistant to the Egyptian President, promised that “the time will come when we will have good news and decisions about Kosovo.” During a visit to Kosovo to celebrate the country's fifth anniversary of their declaration of independence, Pakinam al-Sharqawy, advisor to Egyptian President, declared on February 17 "that Egypt is about to recognize Kosovo.” In early April 2013 Egyptian President Mohamed Morsy stated that Egypt is close to recognising Kosovo.

==== Recognition ====
After Serbia and Kosovo reached an agreement to normalize relations in April 2013, it was reported that Egypt had been delaying recognizing Kosovo until after the agreement with Serbia was finalized.

On 26 June 2013 the ministry of foreign affairs issued a statement about the recognition of Kosovo by Egypt.

In 2021 Egypt maintained the stance towards Kosovo as being a "frozen" recognition, meaning that the country does not vote in favor of Pristina's membership in international organizations. This has been confirmed by Egyptian President Abdel Fattah el-Sisi in conversation with Serbian National Assembly President Ivica Dacic in Cairo.

== Diplomatic representation ==
Kosovo has an open liaison office in Cairo.

== See also ==
- Egypt–Serbia relations
- Egypt–Yugoslavia relations
