= Rabaa massacre =

Forceful dispersal of pro-Morsi sit-in in Cairo, Egypt

- Part of the post-coup unrest in Egypt (2013–2014)
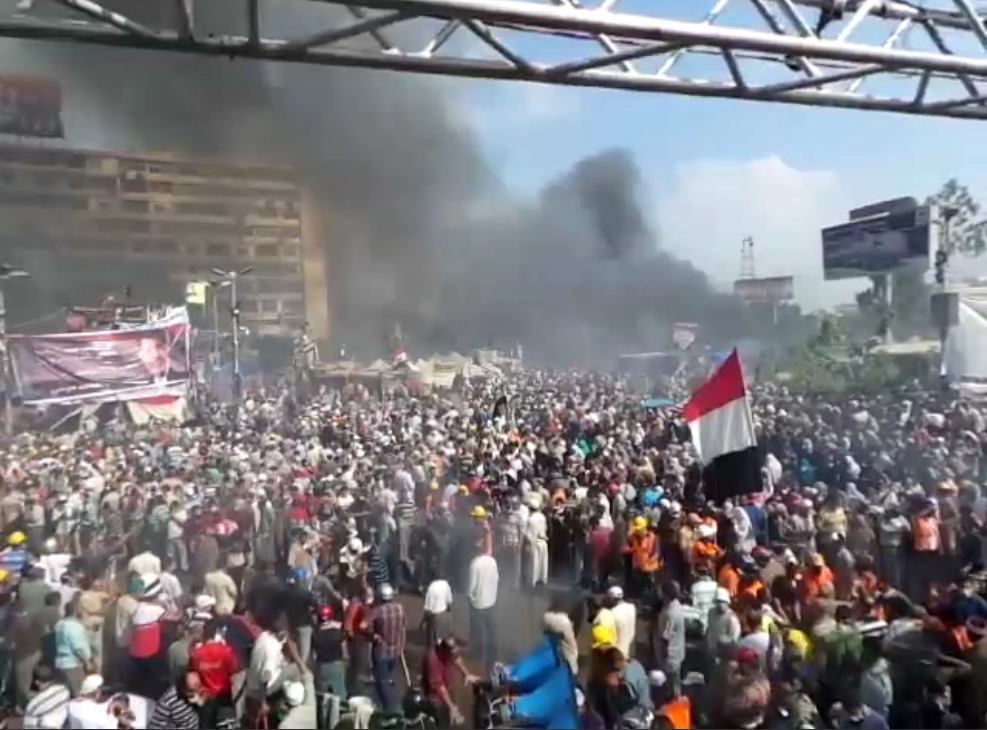
- Rabaa el-Adaweya Square during the dispersal
- Location: Rabaa El Adawiya, Nasr City, Cairo, Egypt
- Date: August 14, 2013; 13 years ago
- Target: Pro-Morsi demonstrators: Muslim Brotherhood; National Coalition for Supporting Legitimacy; Unaffiliated protesters
- Deaths: Estimates vary: Human Rights Watch: 904–1,000+ protesters; 817 at Rabaa Square 87 at al-Nahda Square: Egypt's National Council for Human Rights: 632 killed; 624 protesters 8 police officers: Health Ministry: 638 killed; 595 protesters 43 police officers: National Coalition for Supporting Legitimacy: 2,600 deaths
- Injuries: At least 3,994 injured
- Perpetrators: (Egypt) Supreme Council of the Armed Forces; Egyptian National Police; Central Security Forces; Egyptian Armed Forces
- Motive: Protest dispersal

On 14 August 2013, the Egyptian police and to a lesser extent the armed forces, under the command of then-Defense Minister Abdel Fattah el-Sisi, used lethal force to clear two camps of protesters in Cairo. Estimates of those killed vary from 600 to 2,600. For six weeks, the two sites, at Rabaa al-Adawiya Square and al-Nahda Square, had been occupied by supporters of President Mohamed Morsi, who had been overthrown by a military coup the prior month following mass protests against his rule. Initiatives to end the six-week sit-ins by peaceful means had failed. The camps were cleared out within hours.

Human Rights Watch (HRW) described the sit-in dispersals as crimes against humanity, and called them "one of the world's largest killings of demonstrators in a single day in recent history", in reference to the numerous deaths that occurred.

The exact death toll during the incident is unclear, and multiple sources have given conflicting estimates. HRW stated that 817 were killed by government forces in Rabaa Square and 87 in al-Nahda Square. The Egyptian Health Ministry figures were 595 protesters and 43 police officers killed, and 3,994 injured. However, The Forensic Medical Authority stated that the number of police officers killed was only eight. Egypt's National Council for Human Rights stated that at least 624 civilians were killed. The Muslim Brotherhood and the National Coalition for Supporting Legitimacy stated the number of deaths from the Rabaa al-Adawiya Mosque sit-in alone was about 2,600. The total casualty count made 14 August the deadliest day in Egypt since the 2011 Egyptian revolution which toppled former president Hosni Mubarak.

Several world leaders denounced the deadly violence during the sit-in dispersion. However, the sit-in, before it was dispersed, was coupled with widespread violent acts of retaliation by the Islamist groups targeting government security personnel and churches in several cities across Egypt. The interim government declared a three-month-long state of emergency and curfews were enforced in many cities.

== Background ==
Following the 2011 Egyptian revolution, Hosni Mubarak was ousted as president. After a period of instability, the Muslim Brotherhood took control of the government. However, within less than a year, mass protests calling for the resignation of President Mohamed Morsi culminated in the second revolution known as the 2013 Egyptian coup d'état.

Supporters of the deposed president had occupied two squares – Rabaa al-Adawiya in Nasr City, Cairo and al-Nahda in Giza – originally to celebrate the one-year anniversary of his presidency, but from 3 July onwards to protest his ouster, vowing to remain there until Morsi was reinstated. Internal and external reconciliation processes were established to attempt to resolve the crisis peacefully.

However the sit-ins became flash points for outbreaks of violence and bloody confrontations amongst pro-Morsi, anti-Morsi demonstrators and security forces. The encampments became permanent with stores, barbers and their own TV station. Authorities saw the camps as destabilising and disruptive and representing "a threat to the Egyptian national security and an unacceptable terrorizing of citizens," accusing the pro-Morsi side of provoking bloodshed to win sympathy. They also considered the standoff a hinder to putting Egypt on a "roadmap" to restoring civilian democracy, with a new constitution and new elections. The government threatened a raid on the protest camps on multiple occasions. An ultimatum was issued for the 14th of August, although Al-Azhar, Egypt's official Islamic authority, denied that such a warning had been given.

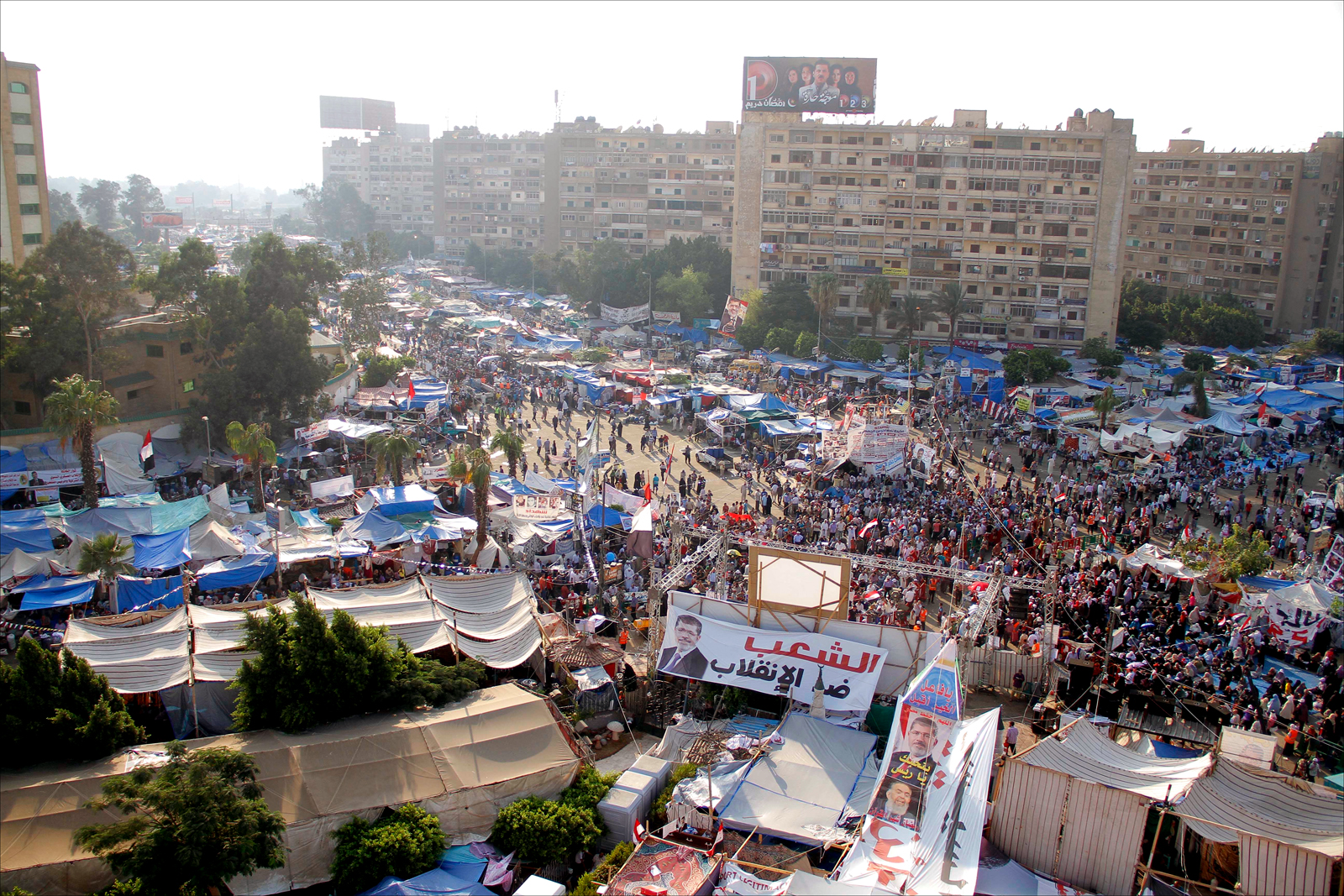
The area around the Rabaa al-Adaweya Mosque had been packed with Muslim Brotherhood supporters sleeping in tents for over a month before the sit-in was cleared.

=== Warning ===
Initiatives in an attempt to resolve the tension, including foreign-backed efforts by Gulf Arab countries, the European Union and the United States, failed to yield a positive outcome. The state authorities referenced these failures and issued the ultimatum. Prime Minister Hazem el-Beblawi warned ahead of the Muslim Eid al-Fitr holiday that the government's decision to clear the sit-ins was "irreversible".

According to the Interior Ministry, the plan was to disperse the six-week-old sit-ins gradually by forming cordons around the two sites as early as dawn Monday, 12 August, allowing protesters to leave but preventing others from getting in, to minimize casualties before using water cannons and tear gas. Leaked news of the plan prompted thousands of protesters to defiantly flood into two protest camps, prompting police to postpone the move as the protesters fortified the sit-in camps. In Rabaa, men with helmets, sticks and what appeared to be protective sports equipment guarded barricades made of sandbags, truck tires and brick. They also built three concrete waist-high barriers to stop armored vehicles from entering the camps.

== Dispersal ==
On 14 August 2013, shortly after 7:00 am, Egyptian police moved in to disperse the camps. According to the Interior Ministry, the plan was to stop the protests gradually by cutting off supply lines while providing a safe exit for those who elected to leave.

By 8:00 the smaller camp – near Cairo University in Giza — was cleared of protesters. However, it took about 12 hours for police to take control of the main sit-in site near the Rabaa al-Adawiya Mosque that served as the epicenter of the pro-Morsi campaign. Police in riot gear fire birdshot and tear gas, supported by bulldozers to clear barricades for armored vehicles. Military helicopters swooped low over the encampment and, using loudspeakers, warned the thousands of demonstrators to leave the area along designated routes to safety.

Thousands of Morsi supporters chanting "Allahu Akbar" tried to join those besieged by the security forces but they were driven away when police fired tear gas. All entrances to Rabaa were blocked by security forces. Brotherhood spokesman Gehad El-Haddad alleged that police snipers fired at Rabaa protesters from the rooftop of surrounding buildings and protesters also said that snipers fired down on those trying to flee or reach safety. In the afternoon, the protesters managed to push the police back to the point where they could get into a makeshift hospital. Shortly before dusk, soldiers and police officers renewed their push and protestors were forced to flee. Government forces seized control, destroying what remained of the protest camp.

The National Coalition for Supporting Legitimacy, a pro-Morsi group, reiterated its rejection of violence and called on its members to continue to protest "to stop the massacre". The attacks set off retaliatory clashes and protest marches. Protesters blocked important roads, including the Ring Road, a key route that connects many of Cairo's major districts. Crowds of Morsi supporters marched toward eastern Cairo in the late morning, running into a barrage of gunfire as they confronted police lines. Separately, a number of attacks on police stations occurred around the country. Interior Minister Mohamed Ibrahim put the number of stations attacked at 21. Angry mobs also attacked dozens of Christian properties. By nightfall, the military-backed interim government had declared a state of emergency and instituted a curfew. However, protesters established new sit-ins outside Mustafa Mahmoud Mosque in Mohandeseen, Giza and others in cities around the country, defying the new curfew and the interior minister's vows to break up any such assemblies.

Initial reports by the Egyptian Health Ministry said 235 protesters, three journalists and 43 policemen died in the violence and more than 2,000 were injured, with the death toll expected to rise. Egyptian state television aired images of weapons confiscated from the sit-in protesters' camps, including automatic rifles and thousands of rounds of ammunition. An Egyptian free-to-air satellite news television channel aired infrared footage appearing to show pro-Brotherhood rioters firing automatic weapons against security forces. Some political analysts opined that the force used by the police was designed to provoke a violent response from supporters of the Muslim Brotherhood to justify the police response.

== Aftermath ==
The violence spread across the country as people learned what had happened in Cairo and many protesters took to the streets in anger. In the Giza Governorate, an angry mob attacked a police station, one of 21 such attacks according to the interior ministry. In southern Egypt, between two and seven Coptic Christian churches were burned to the ground, according to The New York Times, while the interior ministry said that at least seven Coptic Christian churches had been vandalised or torched by Islamists. One Coptic rights group, Maspero Youth Union (MYU), estimated that as many as 36 churches were devastated by fire across nine Egyptian governorates including in Minya, Sohag and Assiut, and many other churches were looted or stormed in the ensuing street violence. Christian activists accused Morsi supporters of waging "a war of retaliation against Copts in Egypt." Muslim Brotherhood supporters also attacked government headquarters in several governorates. Supporters of Morsi staged solidarity protests against the crackdown, with clashes reported in Ismailia, Alexandria, Suez, Upper Egypt's Assiyut and Aswan and other places. In defiance of the curfew, Morsi supporters vowed to return to the streets to continue protesting against the crackdown and coup. Egyptian banks and its stock market were closed through 15 August. Rail travel into and out of Cairo was also suspended. In Giza, hundreds of Morsi supporters set fire to local government offices. The government then authorised the use of live ammunition on anyone attacking state buildings.

Tamarod called on its supporters on 16 August to form neighbourhood watch groups to guard against Morsi supporters while Morsi supporters vowed to keep up their campaign to get the deposed president reinstated.

The next day, hundreds of Morsi supporters barricaded themselves at the Fateh Mosque in Cairo. A day later, security forces dispersed the demonstrators. The Muslim Brotherhood reiterated its call to hold continued protests and called for a "Day of Rage" after Friday prayers on 16 August with Muslim Brotherhood spokesman Gehad el-Haddad writing on Twitter: "Anti-coup rallies tomorrow will depart from all mosques of Cairo and head towards Ramsis square after Jumaa prayer in 'Friday of Anger'." The party also released a statement that read: "Despite the pain and sorrow over the loss of our martyrs, the latest coup makers' crime has increased our determination to end them." By 20 August, the leader of the Muslim Brotherhood, Mohammed Badie, who had been in hiding, was arrested after being found in a residential flat in Nasr City. Pro-Morsi supporters continued to rally and by 30 August, six more protesters had died.

=== State of emergency and curfew ===
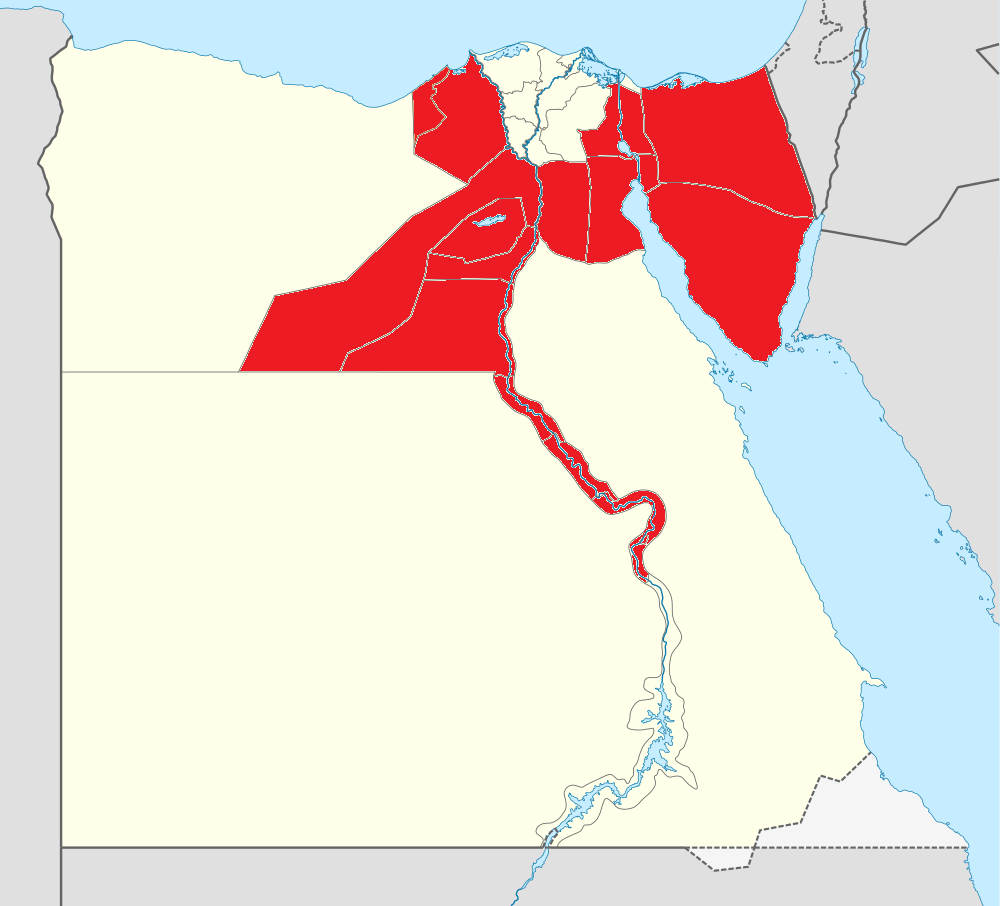
Map showing extent of the curfew issued by the interim Egyptian government on 14 August 2013.

The interim government declared a month-long state of emergency, commencing at 16:00. The right to a trial and the due process of the law were suspended. A 19:00 curfew was declared in 14 out of the 27 governorates (Cairo, Giza, Alexandria, Suez, Qena, Ismailia, Asyut, Sohag, Beni Suef, Minya, Beheira, South Sinai, North Sinai and Faiyum). The army promised to enforce the curfew with the "utmost firmness." The curfew was to be enforced from 19:00–06:00 for a month, along with the state of emergency. The following day, Egypt's interim cabinet lifted the curfew in the cities of Sharm el-Sheikh, Taba and Dahab in South Sinai to protect tourism. Within a week, the curfew started to hurt the Cairo economy. On 24 August, the interim cabinet decided to shorten the curfew by two hours to 21:00–06:00 excluding Fridays. On 31 August, the curfew was again shortened by another two hours to 23:00–06:00 excluding Fridays where the curfew remained from 19:00–06:00. On 12 September, Egypt's interim government decided to extend the state of emergency for 2 more months, until 14 November, along with the curfew which remained unchanged. Starting 21 September, the curfew was again shortened by two hours to 00:00–05:00 excluding Fridays where the curfew was shortened by only one hour to 19:00–05:00. On 24 October, the curfew was again shortened by one hour to 01:00–05:00 excluding Fridays where the curfew remained from 19:00–05:00. The state of emergency and curfew was lifted at 16:00 on 12 November, two days earlier than expected, following a ruling by the administrative court.

== Casualties ==
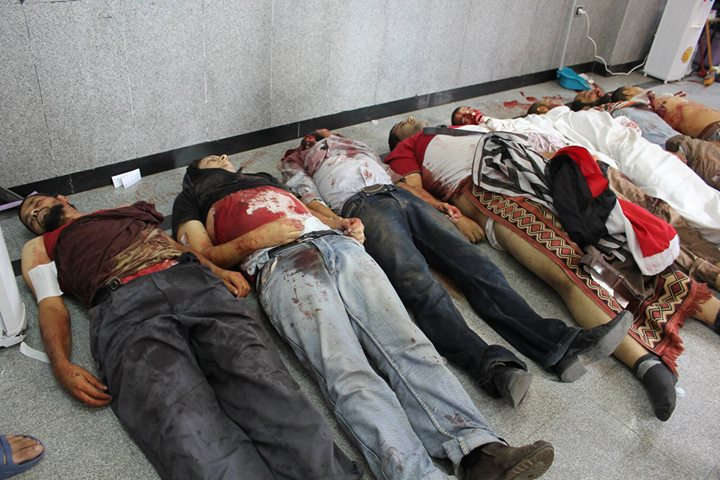
The bodies of protesters who died during the violent clashes during sit-in dispersal

On 14 August, the Egyptian Health Ministry said that at least 600 protesters died and more than 2,000 injured. An additional 43 police officers were killed in the violence, according to the Interior Ministry. It was later declared by the Forensic Medical Authority that only 8 police officers were killed. The Muslim Brotherhood estimated the death toll at 2,000. Many of the dead appeared to be young adults.

On 15 August, the Egyptian Health Ministry raised the death toll to 638 and the number of the injured to 3,994. It is unclear whether the dozen or so charred corpses and those who remained unidentified were included in the official death toll or not. The Muslim Brotherhood and NCSL put the number of deaths from the Rabaa sit-in at the much higher figure of 2,600 protesters.

On 5 March 2014, Egypt's National Council for Human Rights stated at least 624 civilians and 8 police officers were killed.

On 12 August 2014, Human Rights Watch stated in a report based on a year-long investigation that during the 14 August dispersal of the Rabaa al-Adawiya sit-in, security forces envisioned several thousand deaths. It estimated that a minimum of 817 people were killed. Kenneth Roth, the executive director of Human Rights Watch, said that "in Rab'a [sic] Square, Egyptian security forces carried out one of the world's largest killings of demonstrators in a single day in recent history" and that "this wasn't merely a case of excessive force or poor training. It was a violent crackdown planned at the highest levels of the Egyptian government".

Many deaths were reported in Giza. Workers of al-Iman Mosque stated that the ministry "won't acknowledge" in their official death toll tally over 200 charred bodies that had been moved to the mosque from a protest camp nearby. At al-Iman Mosque in Nasr City the next day, hundreds of bodies were still on the floor of a makeshift morgue and wrapped in shrouds and kept cool with blocks of ice, some bodies also bore gunshot wounds and many were charred beyond recognition.

Among the dead was the daughter of Mohamed el-Beltagy, a prominent Muslim Brotherhood member.

=== Attack on journalists ===
During the dispersal, journalists covering the event were trapped. Four of them were killed, while others were injured. Some were detained. According to the Committee to Protect Journalists, it was the deadliest day for journalists in Egypt since the organization began keeping records in 1992. Veteran Sky News camera operator Michael "Mick" Deane, 61, was killed. Deane was an experienced journalist who had previously worked for CNN before working for Sky News for 15 years. Photos of Deane's body showed that he was wearing a helmet that clearly identified him as a journalist. The CPJ said Deane was the 1000th journalist it had confirmed killed worldwide. Egyptian journalist Habiba Ahmed Abd Elaziz, 26, who worked for Gulf News publication XPRESS newspaper, was also shot and killed. Egyptian reporter Ahmed Abdel Gawad, who was with the Al-Akhbar state-run newspaper and was an editorial manager for the Muslim Brotherhood television satellite channel Misr 25, was shot in the back and killed. Rassd News Network (RNN) photojournalist Mosab El-Shami was also killed. Among the journalists most seriously injured were Al-Watan editor Tariq Abbas, who was shot in the face, and Al-Masry Al-Youm photojournalist Alaa al-Qamhawy, who was shot in the foot. Among the detained journalists were Al-Jazeera journalist Abdullah al-Shami and Al Jazeera Media Network's Mubasher Misr photographers Emad Eddin Al-Sayed and Abdulrahman Al-Mowahhed-Bellah, and Freedom and Justice Party (Egypt) (Al-Hurrya wa Al-Adala) / Misr 25 journalist Radwa Al-Selawi. Previously during the 2013 political violence in Egypt, photojournalist Ahmed Assem el-Senousy was killed on 8 July 2013 as a result of sniper fire, while covering a protest. In total, five journalists were killed since political violence erupted after July 2013.

Egypt's State Information Service released a statement on 17 August critical of news coverage from foreign journalists: "Media coverage has steered away from objectivity and neutrality which has led to a distorted image that is very far from the facts. It stated that Egypt was feeling severe bitterness towards some western media coverage that is biased to the Muslim Brotherhood and ignores shedding light on violent and terror acts that are perpetrated by this group."

The United Nations said about the sit-in dispersal that there had been "serious violations of human rights", including the killing of journalists. UNESCO's Director-General Irina Bokova condemned the killing of journalist el-Senousy in July. The International Press Institute demanded that Egypt be held responsible for violations of journalists' rights and the Egyptian military's targeting of the press corps.

== NCHR investigation ==
The Egyptian National Council for Human Rights's investigation blamed both the police and protestors for the incident. The investigation blamed the police for using excessive force, and the protestors for being armed. The NCHR blamed security forces for using excessive gunfire and failing to protect peaceful protestors during the crackdown on the sit-in. According to the report, gunmen inside the sit-in shot at police officers, provoking a violent response from police and an escalation in violence.

== Reactions ==
=== Domestic ===
Mostafa Hegazy, a spokesperson for Egypt's interim government, said: "We're not into the effort of dissolving anyone – or preventing anyone from being active in the public domain, but we're trying to make sure that everyone is legalised according to what the Egyptian law says..." He added that the country was facing a war waged by "terrorist forces". Interim Vice President Mohamed ElBaradei resigned in protest at the crackdown saying his conscience was troubled over the loss of life "particularly as I believe it could have been avoided. It has become too difficult to continue bearing responsibility for decisions I do not agree with and whose consequences I fear." He added that the "state of polarisation and grave division... the social fabric is threatened as violence breeds violence." He was then charged by a Cairo court with "breaching national trust;" the charge of treason could carry a £E25,910 (US$1,430) fine if convicted. It followed a complaint that his resignation gives the international community a false impression of lack of unity which "contradicted reality." However, after his resignation he left the country for Vienna. Interim Prime Minister Hazem el-Beblawi defended the state's reactions and praised the security forces saying that "we found that matters had reached a point that no self respecting state could accept...the spread of anarchy and attacks on hospitals and police stations." He also recommended the dissolution of the Muslim Brotherhood. He further noted that Egypt was headed in the "right direction" and that he did "not fear civil war." In reaction to consideration of cutting aid funds from the U.S. and the EU, he defiantly said that it would be "a bad sign" in cutting of aid, but that while that would "badly affect the military for some time," Egypt would survive as "let's not forget that Egypt went with the Russian military for support and we survived. So, there is no end to life. You can live with different circumstances." It also follows Saudi Arabia's promise to fill in the aid vacuum.

On 17 August, presidential advisor Mostafa Hegazy said: "We are facing a war launched by extremist forces escalating every day to a terrorist war. Forces of extremism intend to cripple our journey towards pure bright future, aiming and willing to bring the whole state into total failure." Foreign Minister Nabil Fahmy condemned suggestion of cutting aid to Egypt and added that the government would not abandon its efforts to restore order ""We keep hearing if Egypt doesn't do this or doesn't do that, then aid will be stopped here or will be stopped there. If one side is revising aid they are giving, we are revising aid we receive as well." He also said in light of international criticism of the move: "The attempts to internationalize the discussions about this event is something that Egypt rejects. I ask the foreign ministry to review the foreign aid of the past and to see if those aids are used in an optimal way." In the wake of continued protests and violence, army chief Abdel Fattah el-Sisi said that he would no longer restrain his forces from confronting "attackers who want to destroy Egypt." He added:

Our self-restraint will not continue. We will not accept any more attacks. We will meet with full force the attackers who want to destroy Egypt. Whoever imagines that violence will make the state and Egyptians kneel must reconsider; we will never be silent in the face of the destruction of the country. [There is] room for everyone [and the security services would not] conspire [to take power]. The will of the Egyptian people is free, their will is free, they can choose whomever they want to rule them, and we are the guardians of this will. The army and the police right now are the guardians of the will of the people with regard to choosing who their leaders will be. I said previously that Egyptians if they want to change the world, they are capable of that, and I tell the Egyptian people now that if you want to build Egypt and its future, you will and you can, and you can make it 'Egypt the mother of all nations' Egypt will be as big as the world itself, with God's will.

Egyptian state television stated that the protest camps had been cleared "in a highly civilised way," while the interim government released a statement praising the "brave" security forces and blaming armed protesters present in the sit-in for the loss of life. The government also called the raids necessary and said police had confiscated guns and other weapons from the camps. The government renewed its promise to pursue an army-backed political transition plan in "a way that strives not to exclude any party". Egyptian Ambassador to the UK Ashraf el-Kholy defended the dispersal and blamed the Muslim Brotherhood for causing the difficulties, saying: "Of course they did nothing but return fire. If you have somebody firing at you then you have to respond." Party spokesman Mona al-Qazzaz said:

This is not a government, this is not a regime, it is a mafia...They failed at every single democratic process, and they came on the back of the tanks as leaders...This is an illegitimate mafia that has hijacked the power of Egypt...They would have to pay the price of their crimes against humanity. They are the illegal people, we have won at every single democratic process and they have lost, and the only way for them to be back in the political arena is through the power of the bullets and tanks.

Grand Imam Ahmed el-Tayeb called for "restraint", saying Al-Azhar is committed to seeking a political solution to the situation. He also urged all political factions to respond to the national reconciliation efforts and said that he had no prior knowledge of the crackdown efforts. The Coptic Church condemned the attacks on its churches and called on the army to restore order. El-Tayeb and el-Baradei were among other advocated of the ouster of Morsi who later were seen to express at least a modicum of sympathy for the protesters due to the heavy-handed nature of the dispersal. The al-Nour Party called on protestors to exhibit restraint, but said the dispersals would further complicate the political process. The April 6 Youth Movement blamed "the army, interior ministry and the Muslim Brotherhood" for the violence. There were also reactions on social media. The New Wafd Party said it was the government's duty to disperse the sit-ins since the mandate to fight violence and terrorism on 26 July. It added that while the right of peaceful protest and freedom of expression is guaranteed, the protesters at both squares were not peaceful protesters and were hiding weapons; it further accused the Muslim Brotherhood of being responsible for the unrest in the country with its allegedly inciting speeches, defiance of the state and disrespect of the will of what they suggested was a majority of the people and of the army that deepened the polarisation. Former presidential candidate Amr Moussa said that "the whole Egyptian society should stand against any attempt to raise strife on the current incidents." The founder of the Free Egyptians Party Naguib Sawiris said: "Decision to disperse MB sit-ins was crucial" and that no one accepts sit-ins that block the roads and hinder economic development. Popular Current leader and former presidential candidate Hamdeen Sabahi said: "We support people, army, police against terrorism" and wrote on Twitter, "We will support our people, army and police against the terrorism of those who monopolized the people's will." Former presidential candidate Abdel Moneim Aboul Fotouh added that was in touch with senior state officials and had asked them to take the necessary decision to stop the bloodshed immediately as it could drag the country into a wave of violence and chaos. The Dawaa Salafya called on the cabinet to resign and issued a statement that condemned the violent clashes and warned against dragging the country into mobilisation of both sides, which would negatively affect social cohesion. The foreign ministry also formed a working group of senior officials to follow up on foreign reactions to the crisis and would supply Egyptian embassies with the requisite details and follow up on foreign media coverage of the events, according to the interior ministry.

The Cairo Institute for Human Rights Studies condemned the apparent use of excessive force and lethal violence by Egyptian security forces when dispersing the sit-in of protestors at Rabaa al-Adawiya and Nahda squares. In a statement, the institute said "The action left hundreds dead and thousands seriously injured, as well as dozens of bodies torched in still unexplained circumstances. We believe the security apparatus could have avoided this human tragedy if it had complied with international rules and standards for the dispersal of assemblies. Moreover, in the past weeks, the security authorities have failed to do their duty to take the necessary legal measures to protect public security and citizens, particularly residents and passersby in the aforementioned two areas"

In October 2013, Egyptian Kung-Fu gold medalist Mohamed Youssef was recalled from Russia and given a one-year suspension from all national and international competitions for wearing a T-shirt containing the Rabia sign. In November 2013, Al-Ahly's Ahmed Abd El-Zaher was deprived of his Champions League win bonus, suspended and put up for sale in the January transfer window for a gesture in support of Morsi. On 5 December 2013, the Egyptian Football Association took sanctions a step further, announcing that Abd El-Zaher has been banned from representing Egypt for one year in addition to a 3-month local ban.

=== International ===
Rights groups

On 10 December, thirteen Egyptian and international human rights organizations urged Cairo's interim authorities to probe the violence during the sit-in dispersal in the capital on 14 August. The joint call issued by organizations that included Amnesty International, Human Rights Watch and the Egyptian Initiative for Personal Rights, said an investigation must be launched into the killing of "up to 1,000 people by security forces" almost four months ago when they dispersed sit-ins by supporters of deposed president Mohamed Morsi. "There can be no hope for the rule of law and political stability in Egypt, much less some modicum of justice for victims, without accountability for what may be the single biggest incident of mass killing in Egypt's recent history," said Gasser Abdel-Razak, associate director at the Egyptian Initiative for Personal Rights. "As a first step toward accountability, the government should establish an effective independent fact-finding committee to investigate responsibility throughout the chain of command for the unlawful killings," the rights groups said. They said that on 14 August a "small minority of protesters used firearms... but the police responded excessively by shooting recklessly, going far beyond what is permitted under international law." "After the unprecedented levels of violence and casualties seen since the ousting of Mohamed Morsi, investigations must provide real answers and cannot be another whitewash of the security forces' record," Hassiba Hadj Sahraoui of Amnesty International said in the statement. "Egypt's authorities cannot deal with the carnage through PR in world's capitals, rewriting events and locking up Morsi's supporters." The groups also said the probe should determine whether there is any evidence of a policy to kill protesters or commit other serious crimes.

Supranational bodies

- African Union – The AU was to send a panel consisting of former Malian president Alpha Oumar Konare, former Botswana President Festus Mogae and former Djibouti Prime Minister Dileita Mohamed Dileita, amongst others, to help find a resolution to the conflict. The panel was in Egypt from the end of July to early August. AU spokesman El Ghassim Wane said: "We have formally written to the Egyptian interim authorities to inform them of the intention of the panel to come back to Egypt, and we look forward to the cooperation of both the interim authorities and all Egyptians. The plans are for the panel to go back to Egypt as early as [this] week. The Peace and Security Council has urged that preparations be expedited for the panel to go back to Egypt. Further polariSation of the situation in Egypt or escalation of violence will have far-reaching implications both for Egypt, the region and the African continent as a whole. And this is why the AU is making sustained efforts to contribute to the ongoing efforts, based of course, on the ownership by the Egyptian stakeholders themselves."
- European Union – European Commission President Jose Barroso and European Council President Herman van Rompuy said in a joint statement: "Together with its member states, the EU will urgently review in the coming days its relations with Egypt and adopt measures aimed at pursuing [the goals of promoting an] end to violence, resumption of political dialogue and return to a democratic process. Further escalation must be prevented. It could have unpredictable consequences for Egypt and for its broader neighbourhood." Just before EU foreign ministers were scheduled to meet, they also warned Egypt's army and interim government that it was ready to "review" ties failing an end to violence and return to dialogue. They two issued statements that read further escalation could have "unpredictable consequences" for Egypt and the region. "The calls for democracy and fundamental freedoms from the Egyptian population cannot be disregarded, much less washed away in blood. In co-operation with its international and regional partners, the EU will remain firmly engaged in efforts to promote an end to violence, resumption of political dialogue and return to a democratic process. To this effect, together with its member states, the EU will urgently review in the coming days its relations with Egypt and adopt measures aimed at pursuing these goals." High Representative for Foreign Policy Catherine Ashton released a statement that read: "Confrontation and violence is not the way forward to resolve key political issues. I deplore the loss of lives, injuries and destruction in Cairo and other places in Egypt. I call on the security forces to exercise utmost restraint and on all Egyptian citizens to avoid further provocations and escalation." Her spokesman, Michael Mann, said that "the reports of deaths and injuries are extremely worrying. We reiterate that violence won't lead to any solution and we urge the Egyptian authorities to proceed with utmost restraint." Envoy Bernardino León said: "No options are being ruled out today. We are discussing responses to the current discussion in a very open-minded way." Foreign Ministers of the bloc were expected to meet on 21 August to discuss how to get the Egyptian junta to resort to find a peaceful compromise to the impasse. He suggested option that could include cutbacks in Europe's 5 billion euro package of grants and loans promised last year, as well as a possible arms embargo The European Union restricted exports of security equipment and arms to Egypt, while Ashton said that aid would remain in place to the most "vulnerable" groups and to civil society. She also said that the member states were reassessing their export licenses.
- United Nations – Secretary-General Ban Ki-moon's spokesman Martin Nesirky said: "In the aftermath of today's violence, the secretary-general urges all Egyptians to concentrate their efforts on promoting genuinely inclusive reconciliation. [While the United Nations was still gathering information,] it appears that hundreds of people were killed or wounded in clashes between security forces and demonstrators." He added that "the secretary-general is alarmed by ongoing developments in Egypt and the widespread outbreak of violent protests and excessive use of force in handling them," and that attacks against churches, hospitals and other public facilities were condemned "which he finds unacceptable."

The U.K., with France and Australia, called for an emergency closed-door meeting of the UN Security Council.
The Office of the United Nations High Commissioner for Human Rights leader Navi Pillay demanded an "independent, impartial and credible" probe into the dispersals and said that anyone found guilty of wrongdoing should be held to account. Spokeswoman Liz Throssell followed up the comments in saying that the office sought to human rights observers to Egypt after government approval. "We're calling to have human-rights officers allowed on the ground in Egypt so they can gather information, they can talk to NGOs, national human-rights institutions, draw up reports."

States

- Afghanistan – An unnamed government agency condemned the "killing of civilian protesters" and expressed hope that "our brothers and sisters in Egypt to [sic] find a peaceful political solution soon."
  - The Taliban condemned the violence and called for the restoration of Morsi as president. It issued a statement signed by the Islamic Emirate of Afghanistan that called on international organisations to take practical steps to stop the violence and "not be satisfied with only condemning this barbaric incident."
- Argentina – An unknown government agency in the country that held the rotating presidency of the UN Security Council at the time of the incident condemned it. A statement read: "The brutal repression against popular protests that won the streets of the main cities of Egypt...[the authorities should] totally and immediately cease the spiral of violence loosed in recent days against unarmed citizens."
- Bahrain – Facing its own uprising, an unnamed government agency called the dispersals necessary to "restore security, stability and public order." The state-owned Bahrain News Agency added that Bahraini authorities urged dialogue and reconciliation.
- Brazil – The Itamaraty issued a press release condemning the alleged repressive brutality shown by Egyptian authorities. The ministry further stated that "Brazil associates itself with the statements made by the Secretary-General of the United Nations in the sense that violence and incitement are not answers to the challenges Egypt faces." It also "calls for dialogue and conciliation," while saying that the dispersal is a "serious degradation of the security situation in a key country for the stability in the region."
- Bulgaria – Foreign Minister Kristian Vigenin condemned the "excessive use of force, leading to casualties on both sides". He said that violence "cannot solve the political and social problems accumulated throughout the years".
- Canada – Foreign Minister John Baird issued a statement calling for calm and said that he was deeply concerned by the situation, while calling on Egypt to implement reforms to ease tensions. He also said that Canada's stance is that Egypt should have a transparent democratic system and encourages and respects civil society and all the segments of Egyptian society. "We urge both parties to avoid violence, and engage in a meaningful political dialogue for the good of all Egyptians. All Egyptians should show restraint and resolve in the coming days."
- Colombia – The Chancellery issued a press release that read, "the Government of the Republic of Colombia deplores the loss of human life and expresses solidarity with the families of the victims of the violent acts that occurred, in the Arab Republic of Egypt, in the past few days." It also "calls for all political actors and the Egyptian society to build a political dialog for the benefit of stability and prosperity of the country and the region" and "orders a cease to the violent acts committed by the public force that deters the safety of citizens and foreigners in Egypt." It added that it was ready to assist its citizens in Egypt through the embassy in Cairo and would seek to move its citizens from Egypt to Istanbul.
- Denmark – An unnamed government agency said that it has suspended 30 million kroner worth of aid, which was channelled via agencies like the World Bank and the International Labour Organization.
- France – Foreign Minister Laurent Fabius said that all options would be considered at an EU foreign ministers' meeting, including a possible suspension of aid. He also said that France had increased its alert level for Egypt on 16 August which would be "formally discouraging" French people from traveling to the country. He also encouraged French people already in Egypt to avoid big cities as Egypt was "in chaos." The foreign ministry released a statement that offered condolences to the families of the violence and read it was "strongly deploring the violence which took place in Cairo during the evacuation operations. [It is] "essential this violence ceases, and that a logic of appeasement prevails. France calls on all parties to exercise the utmost restraint and warns against disproportionate use of force."
- Germany – Foreign Minister Guido Westerwelle said: "We call on all political forces to return immediately to negotiations and avert an escalation of violence. All further bloodshed must be prevented." The government also announced the suspension of 25 million euros in aid that was earmarked for climate and environmental protection projects. Further, the foreign ministry urged its citizens to refrain from travelling to Egypt, as well as extending a previous warning to include Red Sea beach resorts around Hurghada and Sharm El-Sheik. Those Germans who were already at the resorts were advised to be vigilant and stay in close touch with hotel management and travel agents. Travel agency TUI cancelled all bookings to Egypt until 15 September.
- Holy See – Pope Francis called for prayers for "peace, dialogue and reconciliation for that dear land."
- Indonesia – President Susilo Bambang Yudhoyono said that the apparent excessive force used by the security forces was against democratic values and humanity. He called on all parties to "build compromise and seek a win-win solution."
- Iran – The foreign ministry released a statement that called the events a "massacre" and that "while denouncing the violent clashes and condemning the killing of people, expresses its deep concern regarding the horrible consequences. Undoubtedly the current approach to developments in Egypt strengthens the likelihood of civil war in this great Islamic country."
- Ireland – Tánaiste Eamon Gilmore wrote on Twitter: "I deplore the loss of life in #Egypt, appeal for the authorities to show restraint and for all involved to refrain from violence."
- Italy – Foreign Minister Emma Bonino said: "I am deeply pained at what is going on in Egypt, and at the loss of human life there. I was hoping that the squares where the sit-ins took place would empty out once the parties had reached an agreement, and not through the intervention of the police, which doesn't make it any easier to find a solution to the political crisis. I appeal to all the Egyptian forces to do everything in their power to halt the violence that has erupted there, and to avoid a blood bath. All forces of order must exert the maximum self-control, and everyone must likewise avoid any form of incitement to violence."
- Jordan – Foreign Minister Nasser Judeh said: "Jordan stands by Egypt in its serious efforts to impose the rule of law and restore security and stability".
  - The Muslim Brotherhood's political arm, the Islamic Action Front, called for renewed protests in support of Morsi and warned Egypt's military that it had fallen into a "conspiracy" hatched by the U.S. and Israel to weaken Muslims and that the military was a "tool for corrupt and tyrant military regimes." It also called on its local supporters to protest outside the Egyptian embassy in Amman.
- Libya – A member of the General National Congress' Foreign Affairs Committee, Amna Amtair, said that the committee would meet the next day to take important measures regarding the Egyptian situation, but were postponed from meeting on the day itself due to damage done by a renegade group of young Amazigh who broke into the GNC following a demonstration. The Muslim Brotherhood's political arm, the Justice and Development Party's congresswoman in Benghazi, Houda Abdulatif Al-Banani, said that the ouster of Morsi was a "coup against democratic legitimacy" and was "destabilising the effects of the Arab Spring." An unknown government agency issued a statement that read: "Libya believes that what is happening in Egypt... is strictly an internal Egyptian affair in which the Libyan government will not interfere." It also supported measures at consensus building, safety and security in Egypt, while expressing "deep regret and pain for lost lives and bloodshed."
  - The Egyptian consulate in Benghazi was bombed three days later during protests against the sit-in dispersal.
- Norway – Foreign Minister Espen Barth Eide condemned a disproportionate use of violence against protesters. He called for reconciliation which he said had to include the Muslim Brotherhood. It was also announced that export licenses for military equipment had "recently" been frozen.
- Pakistan – Ministry of Foreign Affairs issued a statement that urged restraint from all sides and called for the Egyptian government to release political prisoners. "The government of Pakistan expresses its dismay and deep concern over the use of force by the Egyptian security forces against unarmed civilians."
- Palestine – A Hamas spokesman expressed disapproval for the "terrible massacre" and called on the military to use "peaceful political solutions" in solving the crisis. He said that Hamas "condemns the massacres...and calls for an end to bloodshed and a halt to the killing of peaceful protesters."
- Philippines – After Foreign Secretary Albert del Rosario visited Egypt to ascertain the security situation, he ordered the deployment of a special team to help speed the repatriation of the 6,000 Filipinos in the country, who he also urged to contact their embassy. It also follows a voluntary call to leave that was upgraded to a mandatory evacuation. The Foreign Ministry issued a statement that read: "The marked deterioration of peace and order in Egypt, exacerbated by the ongoing political instability and grave security challenges in that country, make working and living there increasingly difficult and dangerous." Rosario also met with a teenaged Filipino-Egyptian girl who was wounded by a stray bullet during clashes in Helwan.
- Poland – The foreign ministry advised against travel to Egypt and that its citizens in the country should avoid big cities, bazaars, shopping malls and museums. However, it added that it considers Red Sea resorts safe.
  - Polish tourists returning from Hurghada said all tours were cancelled, except visits to Hurghada, and that armed guards were stationed at the town's airport.
- Qatar – The foreign ministry issued a statement that read it "strongly condemns" the violence, called on Egyptian authorities to refrain from security "crackdowns" on demonstrators and said that the best conflict resolution mechanism was peaceful dialogue. State news agency, QNA, quoted an unnamed foreign ministry official as calling on the Egyptian authorities to "refrain from the security option in dealing with peaceful protests, and to preserve the lives of Egyptians at protest sites."
- Romania – The foreign ministry released a statement that read it "decried the human loss of life" and called for all sides to exercise restraint and relaunch the transition to democracy. On 15 August, the Ministry issued a travel warning to Romanian citizens en route to or in Egypt.
- Russia – The foreign ministry issued a statement that read forbearance by all sides in Egypt was of "the highest national interest" and that it was suspending the work of its Cairo consular section as a precaution for two days. Of the about 60,000 Russians in the country at the moment, according to the Russian Tourism Board, the foreign ministry had urged its citizens to refrain from traveling to Egypt and those in the country should avoid big cities and venues of rallies.
- Saudi Arabia – King Abdullah issued a statement that read: "The Kingdom of Saudi Arabia, its people and government stood and stands by today with its brothers in Egypt against terrorism. I call on the honest men of Egypt and the Arab and Muslim nations ... to stand as one man and with one heart in the face of attempts to destabilise a country that is at the forefront of Arab and Muslim history."
- Slovenia – The foreign ministry advised against travel to Egypt and suspended charter flight to the country.
- Spain – A statement by an unnamed branch of government read that the government had "great concern" over the events and that it sent its condolences to the families of those killed. "At this critical moment, it is particularly important that the security forces and the protesters themselves exercise due restraint to avoid the irreversible consequences of violence. The Egyptian people have shown to the whole world their determination to live in peace and democracy. To achieve this aspiration the participation of all political and social forces is needed, without delay, in a national dialogue to make possible the return of institutional normality to Egypt."
- Sudan – An unknown government agency denounced the violence, while the foreign ministry appealed to Egypt's government and political parties to negotiate a solution and avoid further violence.
  - The Sudanese Muslim Scholars Board, an affiliate of the Muslim Brotherhood, issued a statement that read "a battle between right and wrong, between faith and deception, between bare chests and criminal bullets." It also said of the dispersal that it was a "Zionist-Christian plot" and that Islam is now "faced with a war that does not want to see Islam prevail or lead, even if it comes through the ballot boxes. [Egyptians should] reject this injustice and to halt the horrible human slaughter."
- Sweden – Foreign Minister Carl Bildt wrote on Twitter that he was concerned about the events: "Obviously many dead. Reports of live ammunition. Risk of violence spreading. Churches attacked. I condemn the killings and the violence in Egypt now. Main responsibility with regime forces. Extremely hard to restore political process."
- Switzerland – The foreign ministry warned against all travel to Egypt as there was a risk that the violent clashes "will spread throughout the country." It also advised Swiss citizens in the country to keep informed, obey curfews and stay away from crowds or "events of all kinds."
- Tunisia – President Moncef Marzouki and the Tunisian prime minister Ali Laarayedh strongly condemns this coup, calling the military coup and called for the world, because in order to take a position of what is happening in Egypt and the president of Ennahda Rachid Ghannouchi called the dispersal an "abject crime" and said that he was in solidarity with the Morsi supporters' bid to "recover their freedom and oppose the coup d'etat." Following calls from Ennahda members of an alleged coup in Tunisia and a repeat of "the Egyptian scenario", party Vice President Walid Bennani later said: "There's no coup d'etat in Tunisia. There's an opposition party that wants to dissolve the government. The opposition also still wants to repeat the Egyptian scenario. That can't happen. There is no option [for an alternative to rise to] power. There's no resemblance between the two cases." On 16 August, the foreign ministry summoned the Egyptian ambassador to express its concern over the situation in Egypt and the use of force there. It also called for dialogue between all parties so as to prevent Egypt from "slipping into violence, division and chaos."
- Turkey – President Abdullah Gul said: "An armed intervention against civilian people who stage protests is unacceptable, regardless of its justification." He also compared the incident to the first salvos of the Syrian civil war. Prime Minister Recep Tayyip Erdogan's office issued a statement that read: "It is clear that the international community, by supporting the military coup and remaining silent over previous massacres instead of protecting democracy and constitutional legitimacy in Egypt, has encouraged the current administration to carry out today's intervention. The international community, especially the UN Security Council and the Arab League, must act immediately to stop this massacre." It also announced that Erdogan had spoken to UN Secretary General Ban Ki-moon and the permanent representatives of the UN Security Council in regards to the Egyptian issue. Egypt then withdrew its ambassador to Turkey for "consultations".
- United Arab Emirates – An unnamed government agency issued a statement that read: "What is regretful is that political extremist groups have insisted on the rhetoric of violence, incitement, disruption of public interests and undermining of the Egyptian economy, which has led to the regretful events today."
- United Kingdom – Foreign Secretary William Hague issued a statement that read: "I am deeply concerned at the escalating violence and unrest in Egypt. I condemn the use of force in clearing protests and call on the security forces to act with restraint." It was also announced that the country had advised its citizens in the country not to partake in demonstrations and avoid large gatherings. He later said that aid to Egypt should be reviewed without precluding future assistance. "We have to stick to those principles ... of supporting institutions, not taking sides, of promoting dialogue and of keeping faith with the majority of people."
- United States – President Barack Obama "strongly condemned" the dispersal of pro-Morsi sit-ins. He also said: "We sustain our commitment to Egypt and its people... but our traditional cooperation cannot continue as usual," while he also announced the cancellation of the Bright Star military exercises between the U.S. and other Arab states. Despite his condemnation, aid to Egypt remained in place. A spokesperson said the US$1.5billion of aid the United States gives to Egypt annually was under review. White House spokesman Josh Earnest said: "The world is watching what is happening in Cairo. We urge the government of Egypt – and all parties in Egypt – to refrain from violence and resolve their differences peacefully. We have repeatedly called on the Egyptian military and security forces to show restraint and for the government to respect the universal rights of its citizens, just as we have urged protesters to demonstrate peacefully." He added that the United States strongly opposed the state of emergency. Secretary of State John Kerry called the events "deplorable" and a "serious blow" to reconciliation efforts. On 15 August, President Obama canceled joint military training exercises with the Egyptian military.
- Venezuela – President Nicolas Maduro condemned the violence two days later and announced his decision to recall the ambassador to Egypt and leave the commercial attaché in charge of the embassy. He added that despite political differences with the Muslim Brotherhood, "we alerted very early on that the coup against president Morsi was unconstitutional and illegal. President Morsi is kidnapped and is the constitutional president of Egypt...The imperialist hands that are reaching into Egypt are responsible for the bloodbath."
- Vietnam – An unnamed government agency said on 22 August that it had deep concern over the escalation of violence and called on all related parties to exercise restraint.

The Nordic countries also advised against travel to Egypt as tour operators began cancelling trips to the country and bringing back those already in the country.

Outside protests

Hundreds of people protested in favor of the Brotherhood and Morsi in Kuwait and chanted slogans against then-general Abdel Fattah el-Sisi, while an unnamed cleric called on Kuwaitis to protest after Friday prayers outside of the U.S. embassy. Other protests were held in Tel Aviv and Gaza, as well as Turkey, Tunisia and Jordan. In Ankara, about 300 protesters gathered outside the Egyptian embassy, then went to the U.S. embassy and chanted anti-U.S. slogans and held up pictures of Morsi. In Vienna, about 500 demonstrators, most of them Egyptians, gathered in St. Stephens Square, chanting Morsi's name. Organiser Ali Ibrahim of the Egyptian Community in Austria said that the protest was not in support of Morsi but "for democracy and the protection of freedom." After Friday prayers, thousands of protesters gathered in several cities across Indonesia, calling for an end to any violence in Egypt. At a sit-in near the Egyptian embassy in Algiers, dozens of Egyptians, mostly students, protested against violence and denounced the events as "against the Egyptian people."

Media

The New York Times called the dispersal the "clearest sign yet that the old Egyptian police state was re-emerging" and added that its reporters saw no evidence of weapon stockpiles in the protest camps. Al Jazeera featured an article entitled "The Egyptian coup and the lessons of Turkey" with the sub-heading that military was backtracking on the democracy that Egyptians had fought for. International commentators asked if this could lead Egypt into a civil war or even make the country a failed state. Al Jazeera suggested that the Egypt conflict divided the U.S. and its other "long-time" regional partners over their stance on the issue. Qatari-owned Al Jazeera also singled out Qatar as an exception to the Gulf Arab counties which were supportive of the ousting of Morsi. It also highlighted the Gulf Arab reversion for the Muslim Brotherhood as a potential destabiliser to its own regimes. Bloomberg suggested the U.S. was in bind as its regional allies were supporting different sides in Egypt. It also drew parallels for its foreign support for Syrian rebels amongst its allies, but supporting a different side in the Egyptian conflict. It quoted Brian Katulis, a foreign policy analyst at the Center for American Progress, who said: "What we're seeing in the Middle East is a competition for power and influence among the key states that are wealthier and have more resources. What Qatar and Turkey say is almost a 180-degree opposite of what the Emirates and the Saudis are saying publicly."

Financial markets

Egyptian shares fell the most in two months. The benchmark EGX 30 Index slumped 3.9 percent, the most since 12 June to 5,334.55 at the 1:30 p.m. close in Cairo. About £E332 million (US$48 million) of shares traded, compared with a one-year daily average of £E391 million. Commercial International Bank Egypt SAE, the country's biggest publicly traded lender, led a list of 29 decliners with a 5.4 percent dive.

Other

- The Muslim Brotherhood's media office in London issued a statement that read the world "cannot sit back and watch while innocent men, women and children are being indiscriminately slaughtered. The world must stand up to the military junta's crime before it is too late."

== Rabia sign ==
The Rabia sign.

As a result of the dispersal of the sit-ins, the Rabia sign (or R4BIA as some supporters call it) emerged widely among the pro-Morsi and pro-Brotherhood masses as a part of a protest campaign against the post-Morsi governmental authorities. The origin of the sign is unclear. Raba'a means "fourth" in Arabic and the symbol was named after the Rabaa al-Adawiya square. Some credit its invention to Recep Tayyip Erdoğan, then Prime Minister of Turkey.

== See also ==
- Mohamed Soltan
- 2014 Egyptian constitutional referendum
- 2014 Egyptian presidential election
- 2015 Egyptian parliamentary election
- 2013 Republican Guard headquarters clashes
- Grand Mosque seizure, similar event in Saudi Arabia regarding the siege of Masjid al-Haram
- Kerdasa massacre, which happened on the same day
- Waco Siege, an event in the U.S.
- Memali incident
- Siege of Lal Masjid
- Operation Bluestar
