= Michael Deane (journalist) =

British TV cameraman (1951–2013)

Michael Douglas Deane
- Born: 24 September 1951; Hanover, West Germany
- Died: 14 August 2013 (aged 61); Rabaa al-Adawiya, Cairo, Egypt
- Cause of death: Gunshot wound to the head
- Other name: Mick Deane
- Occupation: Cameraman
- Years active: 40 years
- Employer: Sky News
- Spouse: Daniela Deane
- Children: Patrick and Benjamin

Michael Douglas Deane (24 September 1951 – 14 August 2013), known as "Mick", was a British journalist and cameraman who worked for ITN, CNN, and SkyNews. Deane was killed by sniper fire while covering the Rabaa massacre in Cairo, Egypt, which the Committee to Protect Journalists said was Egypt's most violent day against journalists and which Human Rights Watch called Egypt's bloodiest day.

== Personal ==
Michael Douglas Deane was born in 1951 in Hanover, Germany and attended school in Surbition Grammar School. In the 1970s, he met his wife Daniela, an Italian-American journalist, in Rome during a hot air balloon ride. Deane pursued a career of journalism as a sound and cameraman. The couple and their two sons, Patrick and Benjamin, lived first in Washington, D.C. and then in Jerusalem during the latter years of his career. In 2009, they moved to London, and then to Israel in 2012 to continue his career with British SkyNews. According to Deane's wife, he intended to retire within a year.

== Career ==
Deane began his career as a journalist with CNN as a sound and cameraman in the early 1980s. His first assignments were covering the Israel invasion of Lebanon in 1982 on the Palestine Liberation Organization. After years of experience with CNN and ITN, Deane joined the SkyNews broadcast team as a cameraman and journalist. For 15 years he spent his career with Sky in the US in Washington and relocated to Jerusalem in the Middle East. His last assignment was filming clashes between Egyptian security forces and supporters of Mohamed Morsi, Egypt's deposed president, in Cairo, Egypt.

== Death ==
Michael Deane had just recently been assigned to Egypt with Sky News Middle East correspondent Sam Kiley. Deane's last story was at Cairo's Rabaa al-Adawiya Mosque where he filmed the Egyptian security forces storming a sit-in demonstration on Wednesday morning, 14 August 2013. While he directed his camera at a group of women gathered near the mosque, Deane was shot by a sniper and died minutes later.

== Context ==
The killing of Michael Deane was also reported by the committee to Protect Journalists. It noted that Deane was the 1,000th recorded death of journalists worldwide. He was reported to be one of three other journalists killed that Wednesday. Habiba Ahmed Abd Elaziz, 26, a female Egyptian journalist for the Gulf News XPRESS newspaper, was shot and killed. So was Egyptian reporter Ahmed Abdel Gawad, an editorial manager for the Muslim Brotherhood satellite television channel Misr 25, who was shot in the back and killed. Also killed was photojournalist Mosab El-Shami with Rassd News Network.

== Impact ==
The August 2013 Rabaa Massacre was the most serious massacre in Egypt, according to Human Rights Watch. CNN reported that 580 people were killed and 4,000 others were injured that day.

== Reactions ==
After the death of Deane, his team from Sky News expressed their grief and sorrow for his family's loss. John Ryley, head of Sky News, accredited him as "the very best of cameramen, a brilliant journalist and an inspiring mentor to many at Sky." He also said,

Mick Deane was a really lovely, lovely guy. He was great fun to work with, he was an astonishingly good cameraman who took some brilliant pictures. He was also good fun after the job was done. He was laid back, and I'm really going to miss him, like lots of people here.

Prime Minister David Cameron responded with a tweet: "I am saddened to hear of the death of cameraman Mick Deane, covering Egyptian violence. My thoughts are with his family and the Sky News team."

Nearly a year later, Daniela responded to her husband's killing alongside many others in the opinion page of The Washington Post. She wrote:

We have to remember, then, that behind every number, on the back of every death, is a devastating loss for those left behind. And a very personal experience of grief.

== See also ==
- August 2013 Rabaa massacre
