= Rabia sign =

Egyptian protest hand gesture

R4BIA sign

The Rabaa or Rabbi'ah sign (Arabic: شارة رابعة, pronounced: /ˈrɑːb(i)ə, ˈræ-, -bɑː/; Egyptian Arabic: [ˈɾɑbʕɑ]; Turkish: Rabia işareti) - often stylized as R4BIA or less commonly as Rab3a, is a hand gesture and a sign that first appeared in late August 2013, originating from Egypt and later used by Turkey and used in social media and protest marches in Egypt. It is used by the Muslim Brotherhood and its supporters in Egypt in the wake of the overthrow of Mohamed Morsi, which occurred after anti-government protests calling for his removal. On July 9, 2014, a Brotherhood-affiliated organization declared August 14, the day when the sit-ins were dispersed, "World Rabia Day," in an attempt to garner support across numerous countries.

The sign is named after the Rabaa al-Adawiya Square in Nasr City, Cairo Governorate, which surrounds the Rabaa al-Adawiya Mosque, where a sit-in was held by the Muslim Brotherhood and its supporters to celebrate the one-year anniversary of Morsi's inauguration. The sit-in lasted for about forty days before it was dispersed by security forces, leading to clashes that resulted in 638 deaths, of which 43 were police officers.

Supporters state that the gesture is used to express solidarity with what they call "the thousands wounded, killed and burnt by the Egyptian Army" during the dispersal of their sit-in. The origin of the sign is unknown.

Critics of the Muslim Brotherhood and the Morsi Government allege that the sign implies indirect support for terrorism, due to the sign's use being mostly limited to persons supportive of the Brotherhood, which has been designated a terrorist organization by Egypt. On the other hand, supporters of the Brotherhood, whether inside or outside Egypt, believe the gesture represents freedom and persistence. They also deny any association with terrorism.

Egyptian and non-Egyptian politicians, mostly supportive of the Muslim Brotherhood, are regularly seen making the Rabia gesture, which is identical to one common gesture for the number four. Among these politicians is Turkish president Recep Tayyip Erdoğan who claims the four fingered sign stands for "One people, one flag, one homeland, one nation'.

== Background ==
=== Protests against Morsi ===
Beginning on June 30, 2013, anti-government protests in Egypt were organized nationwide against President Mohamed Morsi, demanding his resignation and consequent early presidential elections. Key participants were the Tamarod movement, April 6 Youth Movement and the Al-Wafd party, in addition to numerous unaffiliated protesters, who were mostly secularists. One of the main causes of the protests, and of the earlier 2012 Egyptian protests, was Morsi granting himself executive powers over courts, which protesters alleged would make him increasingly authoritarian over time. Morsi, being to this date in power for almost one year, refused to resign, insisting that his presidency is "legitimate," having won the Egyptian presidential election of 2012, which was considered to be free and fair. Days before opposition protests, pro-Morsi protesters organized counter-demonstrations to celebrate his one-year anniversary in office, wanting him to remain in office until his term had finished.

On July 1, a 48-hour deadline was issued to Morsi, demanding that he respond to the protesters' demands. Morsi refused to do so. On July 3, which was when the deadline ended, Morsi was removed from offices. Sit-ins originally to celebrate the one-year anniversary of his inauguration became anti-government, anti-protests, and anti-military as supporters of the Muslim Brotherhood and Morsi held two main sit-ins opposing the protests and subsequent overthrow. The sit-ins comprised individuals supportive of the Muslim Brotherhood, who were demanding the reinstatement of Morsi.

=== Sit-in dispersal ===
On August 14, the Egyptian National Police dispersed the sit-in in Rabaa and a smaller one in Nahda. Initially, the Interior Ministry had intended to peacefully evacuate the protesters with little to no force. However, the dispersal resulted in violent clashes, which led to deaths among both sides.

Al-Masry Al-Youm alleged that the protesters at Rabaa owned dangerous weapons.

On the other hand, Human Rights Watch claimed that only firearms were observed, rather rarely, and that the protesters were ″overwhelmingly peaceful to be attacked in such a disproportionate and premeditated lethal way."

The official death toll, according to the Egyptian Health Ministry, was 638 deaths, of which 595 were protesters, and 3,994 injured, in addition to 43 police officers dead. However, the Muslim Brotherhood, along with affiliated organizations, such as the Anti-Coup Alliance and the National Coalition for Supporting Legitimacy claimed that 2,600 protesters were killed. In the wake of the dispersal, violence occurred across Egypt, as retaliation against the security forces who dispersed the sit-ins. Furthermore, many corpses remained unidentified as they bore gunshot wounds and were charred beyond recognition.

In the 2014 report, Human Rights Watch said at least 1,150 demonstrators were killed in the dispersal, which, the organization said, probably amounts to "crimes against humanity."

== Appearance of the sign ==
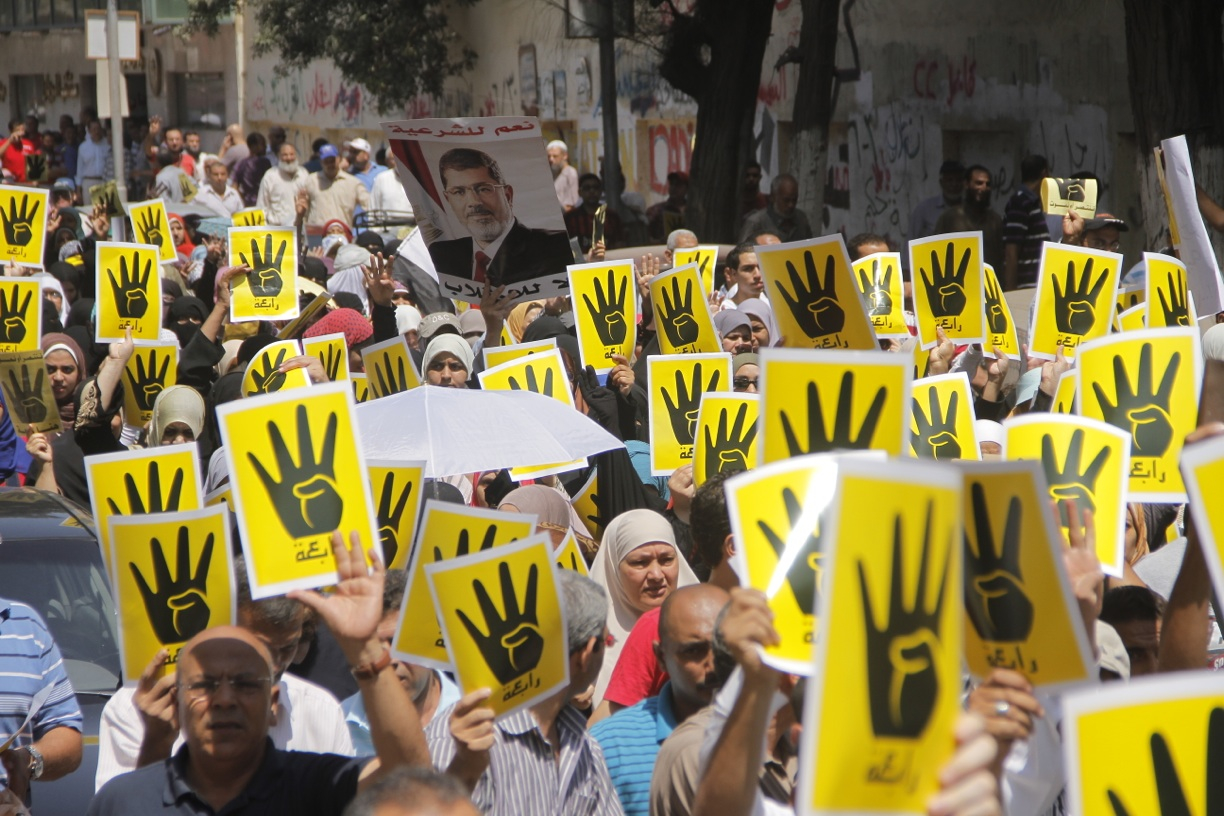
Rabia sign in a protest march, August 23, 2013.

After the sit-ins dispersal, the Rabaa sign emerged widely in social media and protest marches in Egypt. Various reports place its origin in Turkey, not Egypt, and later performed by the Turkish president Recep Tayyip Erdoğan But the sign stemmed from the "Rabaa Al-Adawiya" Mosque, located in Nasr City, Cairo. Rabaa (رابعة) is the Arabic word for "the 4th" which is believed to have influenced the 4 fingered raising gesture. The Rabaa Al-Adawiya Mosque and its surrounding streets, is where the Muslim Brotherhood members were protesting against the removal of the then Egyptian President Morsi, before they were violently removed by the Egyptian military.

=== Meaning ===
The sign is used as part of the protests against the government.

The colors used in the graphical sign, the yellow and black, respectively resemble the Dome of the Rock in Jerusalem, and the Kiswah of the Kaaba.

=== Name ===
The namesake of the sign is the Rabaa al-Adawiya Square in Nasr City, Cairo Governorate, where Brotherhood affiliates held a sit-in. The square is named after the Muslim saint Rabia Basri. The name Rabia in Arabic means has two meanings; 'fourth' (singular feminine), hence the four-fingered hand gesture and also 'Queen' and 'Royalty'.

=== Gesture ===
The gesture is identical to a gesture for the number four, and is made by raising four fingers of either hand (preferably the right hand) and folding the thumb.

== Influence ==
=== Politics ===
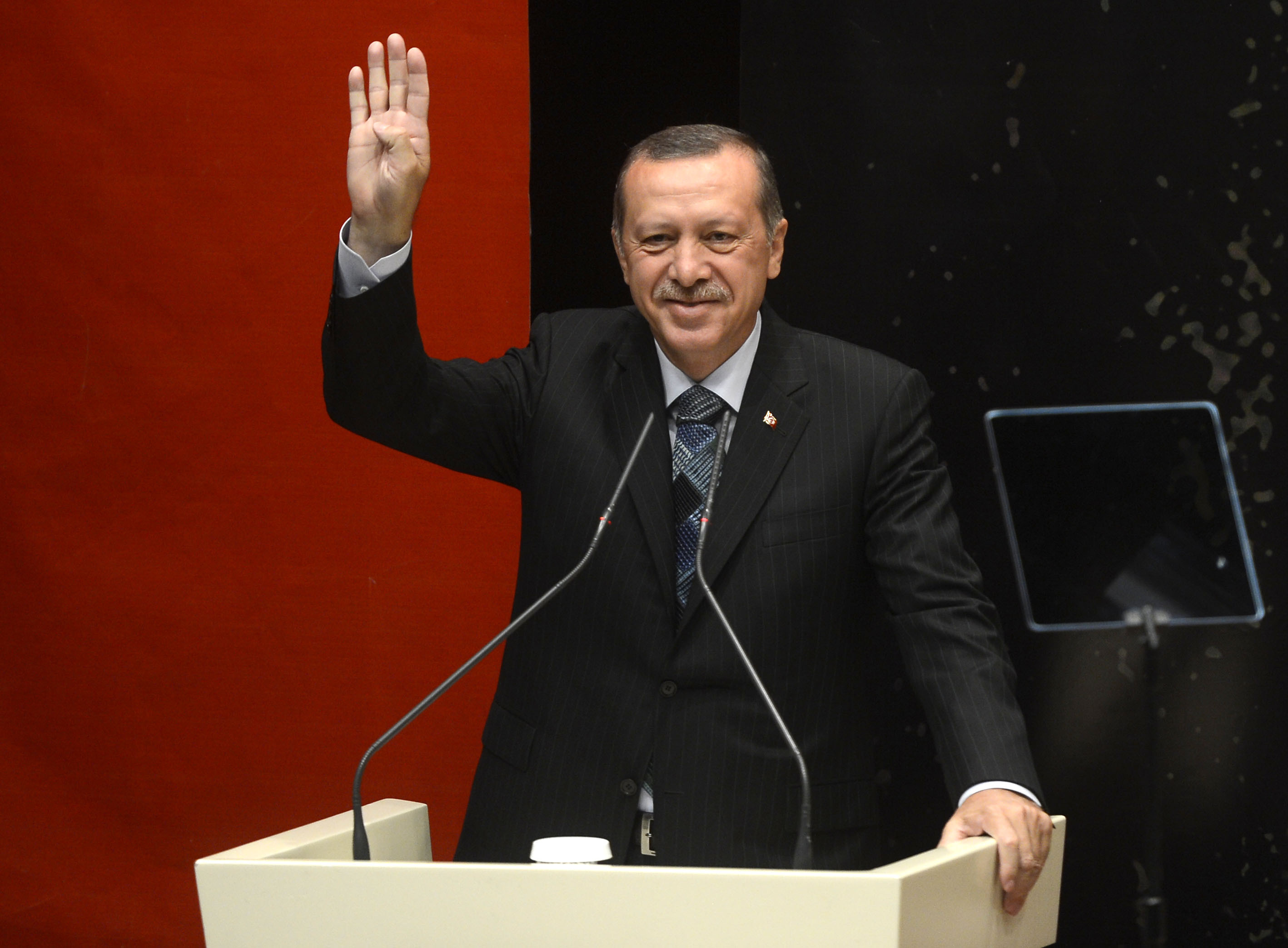
Erdoğan performing the Rabaa gesture.

The Rabia sign and gesture has influenced certain political and social levels among, both in Egypt and in particular, Turkey. Prime Minister and later president of Turkey Recep Tayyip Erdoğan and his supporters, has been seen in several conferences and speeches making Rabia gestures. The Mayor of Istanbul, Kadir Topbaş, announced days after the dispersals in August 2013 at an opening ceremony of the Dörtyol Square in the district of Esenler, that he wanted to rename it to ‘Rabia Square.’

Egyptian kung fu champion Mohamed Youssef was wearing a T-shirt with the Rabia sign on it after winning the gold medal at the 2013 Kung Fu World Championship in Russia; this led to harsh criticism in anti-Brotherhood media and a subsequent one-year ban by the national kung fu federation.

Egyptian football player Ahmed Abd El-Zaher also celebrated one of his goals by making the Rabia gesture, which led to his subsequent suspension by the club from the 2013 FIFA Club World Cup.

On 25 December 2013, the Muslim Brotherhood was designated a terrorist organization in Egypt.

German journalist Thorsten Gerald Schneiders claimed that "[t]he [Rabia sign] is already out of the Islamist spectrum, and has no relation with Islamic radicalism. Its meaning has extended to protesting against dictatorship and tyranny in general."

== See also ==
- Rabaa massacre
- Republican Guard headquarters clashes
- 2013 Egyptian coup d'état
- Three-finger salute (pro-democracy)
