= Habiba Ahmed Abd Elaziz Ramadan =

- Born: November 22, 1986
- Died: August 14, 2013 (aged 26); Rabia Al-Adawiyya, Cairo, Egypt
- Cause of death: Sniper
- Occupation: Journalist
- Known for: Activism

Habiba Ahmed Abd Elaziz Ramadan (November 22, 1986 – August 14, 2013) was an Egyptian journalist and activist who was killed on August 14, 2013 at the August 2013 Rabaa massacre by a sniper in the protests following the ousting of Mohamed Morsi as President of Egypt.

At the time of her death she was working for Gulf News.

She had a substantial following on Facebook with more than 34,000 followers.

A charity fundraising campaign was set up by some of her friends through Charity: water. A video was also created for the campaign describing Habiba and encouraging people to donate.
