= Egypt–Yugoslavia relations =

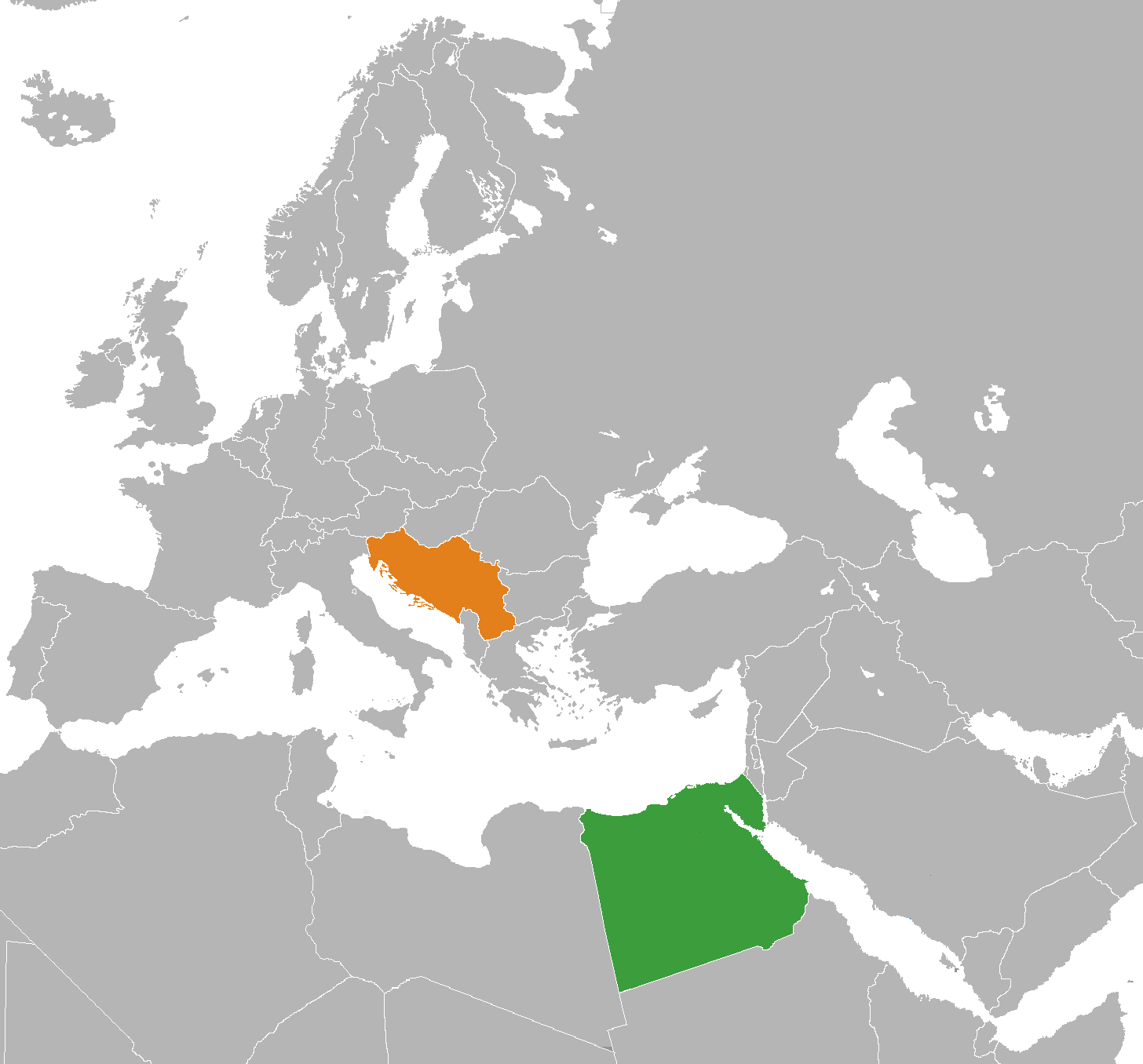

- Egypt: Yugoslavia

United Arab Republic–Yugoslavia relations
- United Arab Republic: Yugoslavia

Kingdom of Egypt–Kingdom of Yugoslavia relations
- Egypt: Yugoslavia

Egypt–Yugoslavia relations were historical foreign relations between Egypt (both Kingdom of Egypt 1922–1953 and post-revolutionary Republic of Egypt/United Arab Republic) and now break-up Yugoslavia (Kingdom of Yugoslavia 1918-1941 and Socialist Federal Republic of Yugoslavia 1945–1992). Both countries were founding members and prominent participants of the Non-Aligned Movement. While initially marginal, relations between the two Mediterranean countries developed significantly in the aftermath of the Soviet-Yugoslav split of 1948 and the Egyptian revolution of 1952. Belgrade hosted the Non-Aligned movement's first conference for which preparatory meeting took place in Cairo, while Cairo hosted the second conference. While critical of certain aspects of the Camp David Accords Yugoslavia remained major advocate for Egyptian realist approach within the movement, and strongly opposed harsh criticism of Cairo or proposals which questioned country's place within the movement.

== History ==
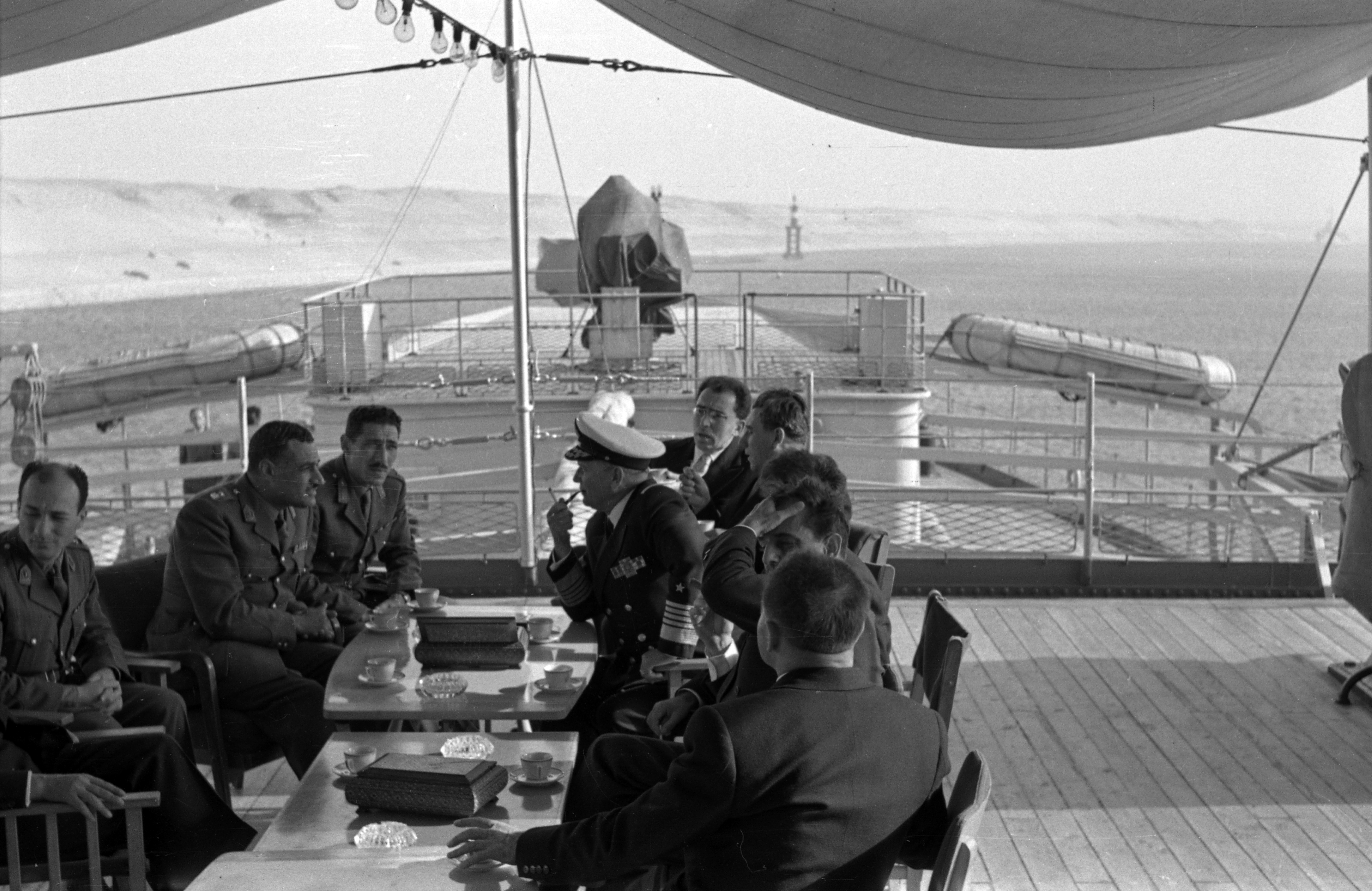
The first meeting between Josip Broz Tito and Gamal Abdel Nasser held onboard Galeb in 1955

=== World War II ===
On September 28, 1943, the Yugoslav government-in-exile was transferred to Egypt where it stayed until 1944.

During the final stage of the World War II some 30,000 Yugoslav refugees from the German occupied Dalmatia found shelter in the Egyptian desert in the camp El Shatt. Camp in El Shatt was one of the first long-lasting effort in state-building by the Yugoslav Partisans (following short episodes with Republic of Užice and Bihać Republic). There they established institutions such as schools, newspapers, as well as new gender and labor relations and used the opportunity to develop their relations with the western Allies of World War II.

=== Cold War history ===
After the end of the World War II in Yugoslavia the new socialist government inherited the old representation in Cairo from the pre-war monarchy. Relations between the two countries were negligible and the trade was limited almost exclusively to Egyptian export of cotton and Yugoslav export of wood. Post-War Yugoslavia closely followed the Foreign relations of the Soviet Union while the Kingdom of Egypt formally followed the Foreign relations of the United Kingdom. The Communist Party of Yugoslavia tried to establish first contacts with Egyptian communists and socialists and their illegal organizations in 1946. The Embassy of Yugoslavia established contact with one female communist activist and supported her in translation of the 1946 Yugoslav Constitution into Arabic publishing it in 10,000 copies. Egyptian communists in Belgrade were particularly satisfied with this action. In April 1947 Egyptian Government requested Yugoslav ambassador to leave the country, but at the same time tried to control anti-Yugoslav media campaign particularly visible in the Sawadi newspaper all up until 1948. New Yugoslav ambassador managed to organize for a group of Egyptian youth to participate in youth work actions in Yugoslavia at the Šamac-Sarajevo railway, yet this action was tolerated by Egyptian hosts as it was only a couple of months since the last ambassador was requested to leave the country.

This strategic situation however changed, firstly in Yugoslavia in 1948 after the Tito–Stalin split which led to Informbiro period. This initially had a negative effect on already negligible relations as the Yugoslav representative in Cairo defected to the pro-Soviet side end emigrated to Moscow with significant part of the archive. Majority of Egyptian communists strongly supported Soviet Union's position and canceled almost all of their links to Yugoslavia. Yugoslavia was nevertheless able to continue its cooperation with legal social-democrats and socialists in Egypt. Relations between the two countries were not initially improved due to Yugoslav support to Israel which resulted in ban on Yugoslav ships in Egyptian ports. In late 1949 and 1950 Hassan Sobhi, leader of the Socialist Party of Egypt and Al-Musawar's author, visited Yugoslavia and upon his return to Egypt organized a lecture on Yugoslav socialism for 200 students. In 1950 Egyptian Government officially prevented any distribution of Yugoslav media in the country. Nijaz Dizdarević, diplomat from the PR Bosnia and Herzegovina and a former Yugoslav Partisan, was sent to Egypt in 1951 to organize and systematize Yugoslav efforts in cooperation with socialists and social-democrats. Situation however quickly changed after the Egyptian revolution of 1952.

==== Post-1952 period ====
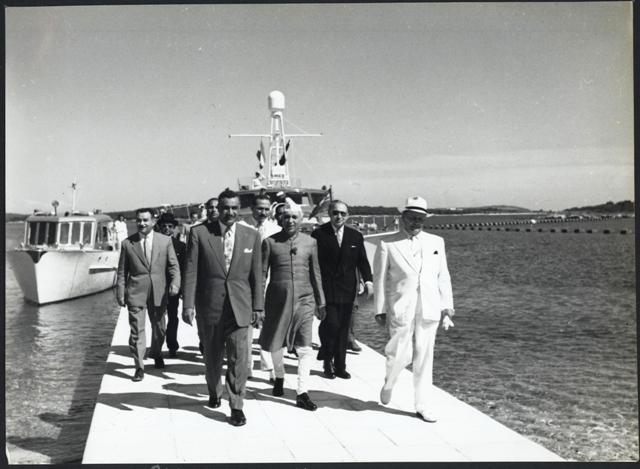
Tito, Nasser and Nehru on Brijuni Islands in 1956

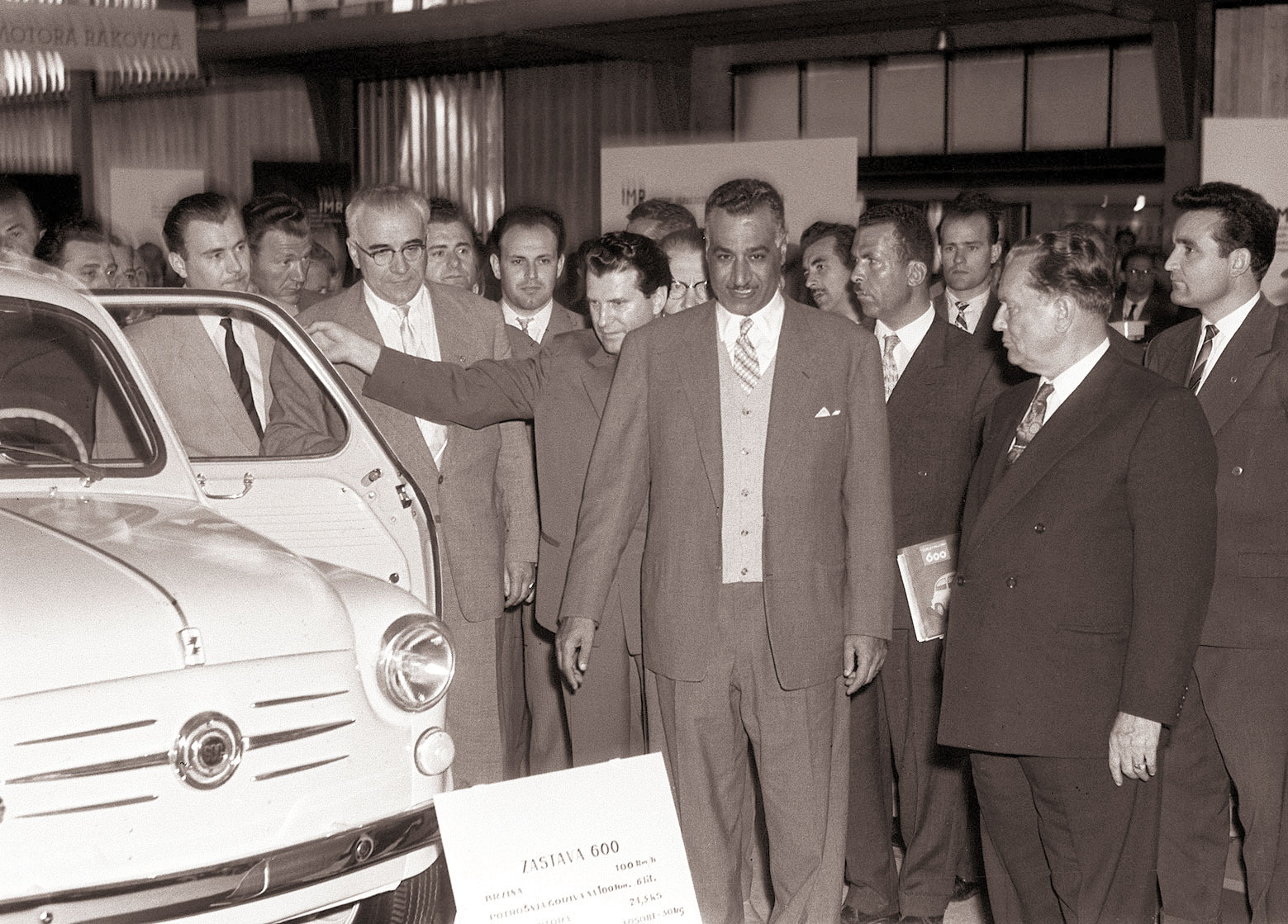
Tito and Nasser in Ljubljana in 1960

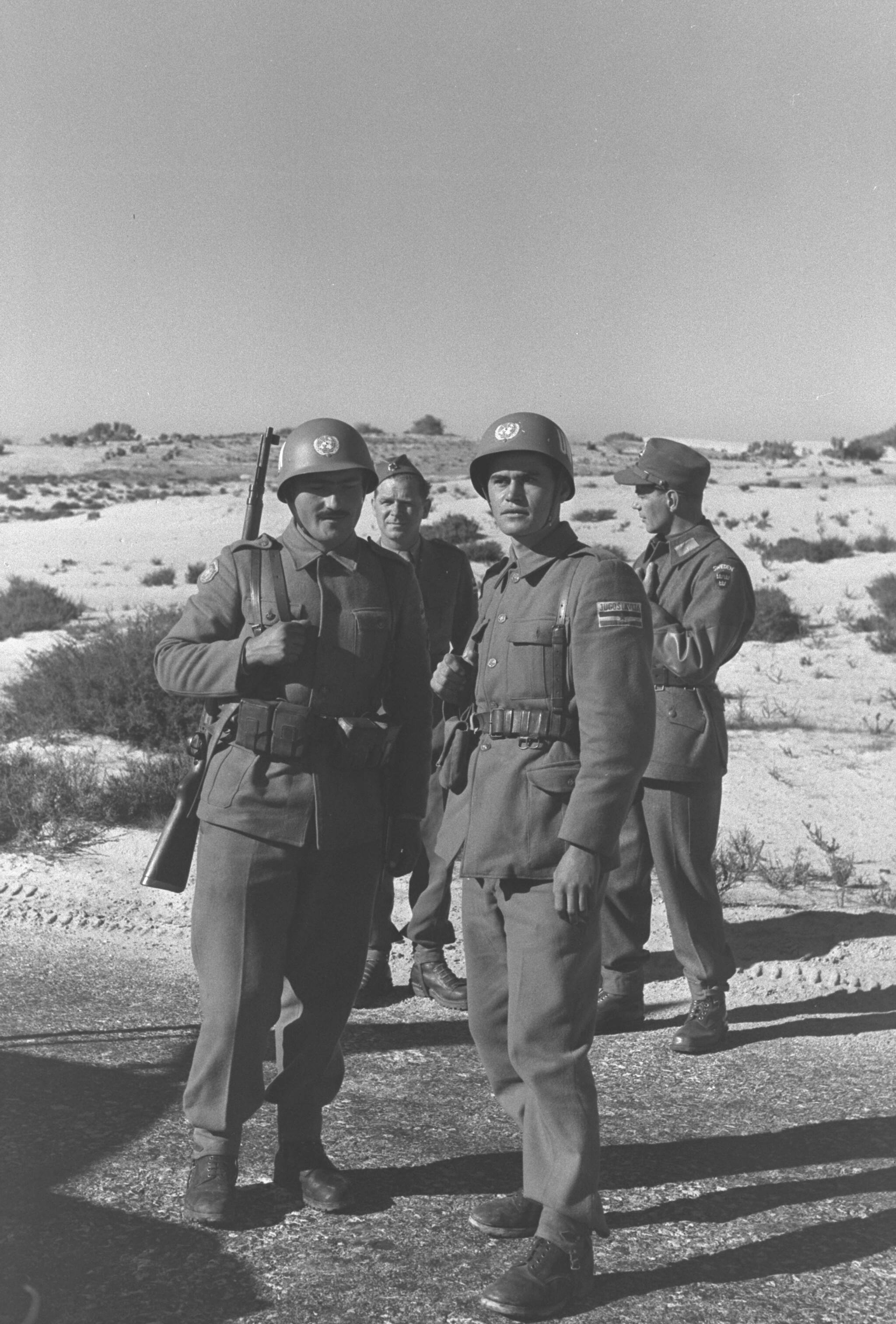
UNEF soldiers from the Yugoslav People's Army in Sinai, January 1957

After the Government of Yugoslavia concluded that the new regime in Cairo is progressive in its orientation and committed to anti-colonialism and anti-imperialism in the Arab World, Belgrade decided to develop its relations with Egypt as a corner stone of its Eastern Mediterranean policy, in part motivated by intention to prevent any neo-Ottomanist moves of Turkey whose position was strengthened by the 1953 Balkan Pact with Greece and Yugoslavia. In 1953 Aleš Bebler, at the time Yugoslav under-secretary for foreign affairs, met with Mahmoud Fawzi after which he informed Koča Popović that there are good prospects for future relations. The Federal Secretariat of Foreign Affairs of the Socialist Federal Republic of Yugoslavia decided to strengthen relations with Egypt by sending its prominent diplomat and future foreign affairs minister Marko Nikezić as a new ambassador to Egypt in march of 1953. Later that year Yugoslav President Josip Broz Tito gave an interview to the Al Gomhuria newspaper which gained significant interest in Egypt. Instructed by the Foreign Office, Ambassador of the United Kingdom to Yugoslavia Ivo Mallet protested against strong pro-Egyptian attitude in Yugoslav media during the Suez Canal quarrels in late 1953. The UK was particularly concerned with the development of military cooperation between the two countries, at the time when London imposed weapons export embargo on Egypt.

It is believed that in 1954 Egypt supported Yugoslav efforts to initiate its military assistance to the National Liberation Front of Algeria by nominally purchasing Yugoslav weapons which was then transferred to Algeria. On his return trip from India, President Tito and President of Egypt Gamal Abdel Nasser met for the first time in 1954 on the Yugoslav training ship Galeb in Suez Canal. Yugoslav side rejected the idea that president should visit Cairo stating that the visit would be inappropriately short, while in effect it wanted not to antagonize Israel hoping that Belgrade may facilitate in de-escalation of the Arab–Israeli conflict. Together with India, Egypt and Yugoslavia played crucial role in the establishment of the Non-Aligned Movement. Brioni Meeting between Yugoslav President Josip Broz Tito, Indian Prime Minister Jawaharlal Nehru and President of Egypt Gamal Abdel Nasser took place on the Brijuni Islands in the Yugoslav constituent People's Republic of Croatia on 19 July 1956. Three leaders signed a document expressing that: "Peace cannot be achieved via division, but via striving for collective security on the global scale. Achieved by the expansion of the area of freedom, as well as through the ending of domination of one country over another." Formal contacts between Yugoslav and the Unified Egyptian Communist Party were established only in 1956 in an effort by the Egyptian party to distance itself from Soviet dependence after the 20th Congress and cooperate with Nasser. In February 1958 delegation of the Islamic Community of Yugoslavia visited Egypt where it reached an agreement with the Al-Azhar University on education of students from Yugoslavia. Yugoslav authorities preferred its Muslim citizens to receive higher religious education in Egypt or Algeria rather than Saudi Arabia, yet popularity of Cairo was decreasing due to perception of highly demanding study program leading some to University of Baghdad. Graduates of religious education in Middle East were faced with some suspicion by Yugoslav authorities.

Yugoslav People's Army was one of 11 national armies which contributed to the United Nations Emergency Force following the 1956 Suez Crisis. In 1957 there was approximately 700 Yugoslav soldiers in the mission. Between 1956 and 1967 total number of Yugoslav soldiers in Sinai reached 14.265.

==== Six-Day War ====
At the beginning of the Six-Day War Yugoslavia negotiated evacuation of its soldiers via Israeli controlled territory. Yugoslavia condemned Israel as the aggressor and requested from the United Nations to stop the aggression and decided to cancel its relations with Tel Aviv on 13 June 1967. Belgrade decided to support Egypt by providing military and humanitarian assistance as close as possible to the level requested by the Egyptian ambassador in Belgrade with first aid arriving in 15 days. Following the defeat of Egypt in the war Yugoslav side provided additional 7 tons of medical materials, 30,000 tons of corn, 10,000 tons of sugar, 1,000 tons of canned fish, 200 tons of milk powder, 500 tons of cheese and 500,000 pairs of shoes. President of Yugoslavia Tito even attended the 1967 Conference of the Warsaw Pact (the only time the President of Yugoslavia was present which led to a short-lasting rapprochement which sharply ended in 1968) in an effort to convince Eastern Bloc countries to support Egypt and Yugoslavia permitted member states to use its airspace to deliver military aid. Koča Popović visited Cairo after the end of hostilities while Tito visited Egypt in August 1967 leading to significant future military cooperation.

== Cultural exchanges ==
The two countries signed the first formal convention on culture in 1958 while individual artists from Yugoslav had been participants in the Alexandria Biennale for Mediterranean countries since its founding in 1955. An exhibition of Yugoslav modern art opened in Cairo in May of 1960 yet due to negative reviews further trip to Iraq was canceled. The Cairo Fine Arts Gallery hosted the highly popular Contemporary Yugoslav Painting exhibition during the 2nd Summit of the Non-Aligned Movement in the city in 1964. Akhenaton Gallery hosted the Modern Yugoslav Drawing and Small-Size Plastic Works of Art exhibition in February of 1987.

== List of bilateral state visits ==
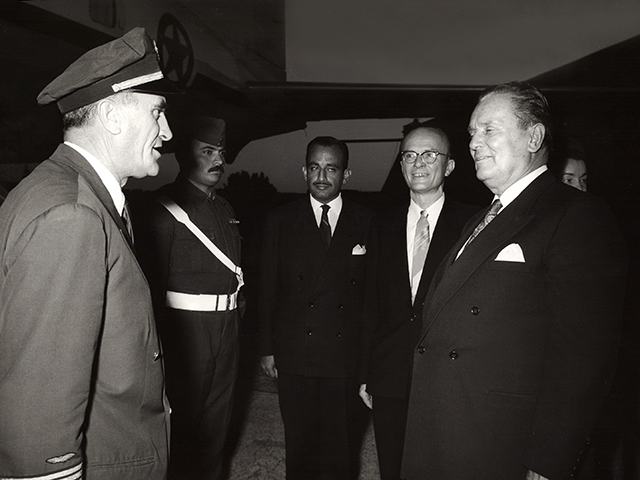
Tito at the Cairo Airport in 1961.

=== Yugoslav visits to Egypt ===
- 5 February 1955: Josip Broz Tito
- 24 December 1955 – 6 January 1956: Josip Broz Tito
- 5 December 1958: Josip Broz Tito
- 20-28 February 1959: Josip Broz Tito
- 17-22 April 1961: Josip Broz Tito
- 18-19 November 1961: Josip Broz Tito
- 4-14 February 1962: Josip Broz Tito
- 18-21 February 1962: Josip Broz Tito
- 5-10 October 1964: Josip Broz Tito
- 15-24 April 1965: Josip Broz Tito
- 2-7 May 1966: Josip Broz Tito
- 8 February 1968: Josip Broz Tito
- 23-25 February 1970: Josip Broz Tito
- 13-20 February 1971: Josip Broz Tito
- 20-21 October 1971: Josip Broz Tito
- 20-27 January 1977: Josip Broz Tito

=== Egyptian visits to Yugoslavia ===
- 12-19 July 1956: Gamal Abdel Nasser
- 2-15 July 1958: Gamal Abdel Nasser
- 12 November 1959: Abdel Hakim Amer
- 12-20 June 1960: Gamal Abdel Nasser
- July 1962: Gamal Abdel Nasser
- 12-16 May 1963: Gamal Abdel Nasser
- 1-4 September 1965: Gamal Abdel Nasser
- 10-12 July 1968: Gamal Abdel Nasser
- 3-4 February 1972: Anwar Sadat
- 11-12 January 1973: Anwar Sadat
- 28-30-?-1974: Anwar Sadat
- 29-30 May 1975: Anwar Sadat
- 8-10 April 1976: Anwar Sadat
- November 1977: Anwar Sadat

== See also ==
- Yugoslavia and the Non-Aligned Movement
- Egypt and the Non-Aligned Movement
- Yugoslavia and the Organisation of African Unity
- Croatia–Egypt relations
- Egypt–Serbia relations
- Mediterranean Games
- Death and state funeral of Josip Broz Tito
- Egypt at the 1984 Winter Olympics
