= Rabaa al-Adawiya Mosque =

Mosque in Cairo, Egypt

- مسجد رابعة العدوية
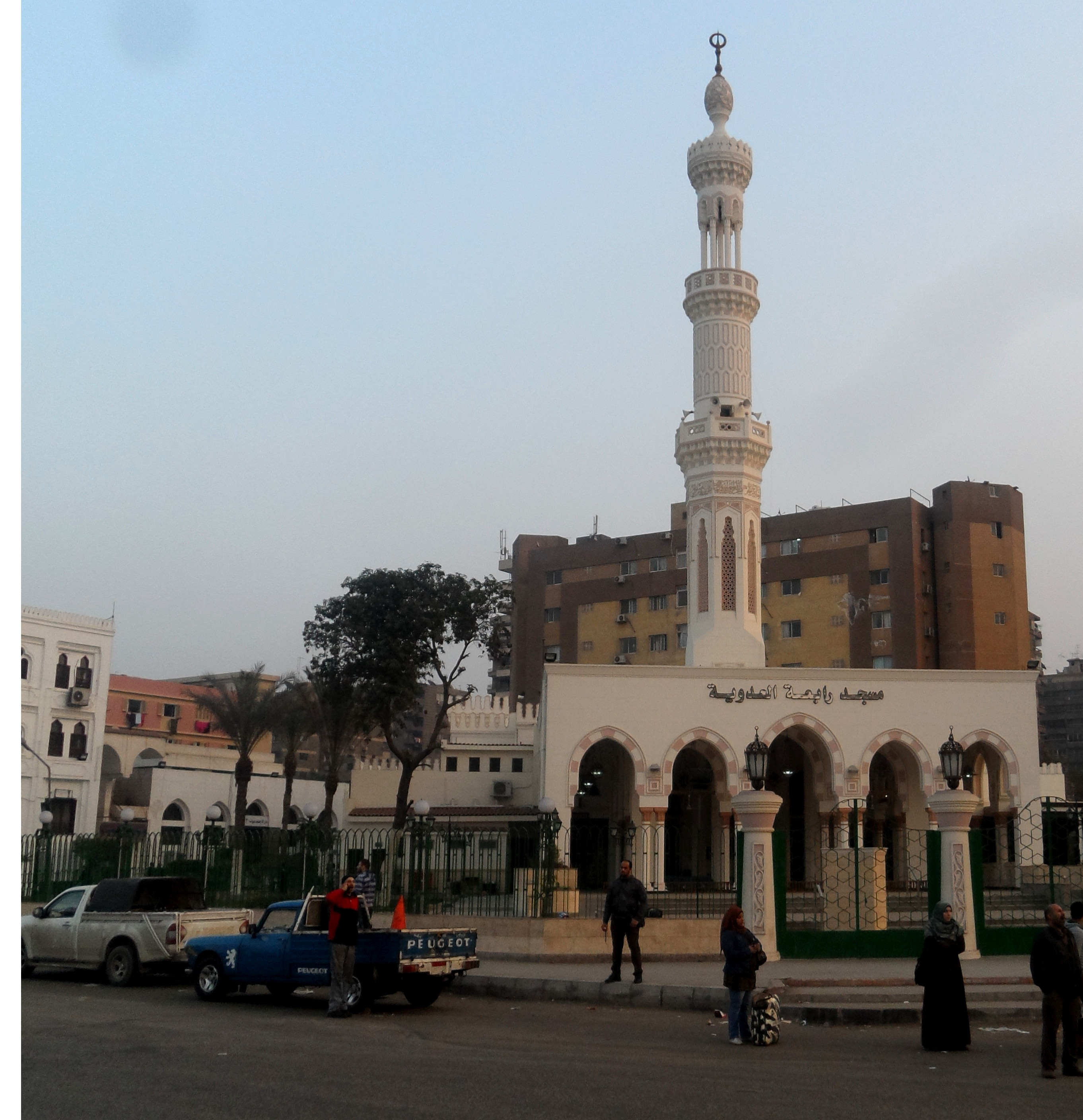
- The mosque in 2014

Religion
- Affiliation: Sunni Islam
- Ecclesiastical or organisational status: Mosque
- Status: Active

Location
- Location: Nasr City, Cairo
- Country: Egypt
- Interactive map of Rabaa al-Adawiya Mosque
- Coordinates: 30°04′00″N 31°19′33″E

Architecture
- Type: Mosque
- Completed: c. 1970s
- Destroyed: August 14, 2013 (during the Rabaa massacre; later restored)
- Minaret: 1

The Rabaa al-Adawiya Mosque (Arabic: مسجد رابعة العدوية, Egyptian Arabic: [ˈɾɑbʕɑ l.ʕædæˈwejjæ]), also transliterated Rabi'a al-Adawiya, Rabaa el-Adawia or Rabaa el-Adaweya, is a mosque located on the northern edge of Nasr City district in eastern Cairo, Egypt. Completed in the c. 1970s, the mosque was named after the 8th-century Sufi saint Rabia al-Adawiya.

A number of high-profile funerals have been conducted at the mosque, including that of Anwar Sadat and Ma'mun al-Hudaybi, partially due to its proximity to the cemetery east of Cairo.

== Rabaa massacre ==
In July 2013, Rabaa al-Adawiya Mosque and the adjacent Rabaa Square was a sit-in protest area for supporters of President Mohamed Morsi after he was removed from power by Minister of Defense Abdel Fattah el-Sisi on July 3. The mosque was later destroyed on August 14, 2013, during what became known as the August 2013 Rabaa massacre, when security forces violently moved in and evacuated the area, resulting in at least 638 deaths. The mosque was later rebuilt under the direction of the Egyptian Armed Forces.

== Association of the Rabia al-Adawiya Mosque ==
The Association of the Rabia al-Adawiya Mosque established in 1993, is an association working in the field of philanthropy and development in Cairo. The Assembly Board of Directors works with a General Assembly of 300 volunteers.

== See also ==
- Islam in Egypt
- List of mosques in Cairo
- August 2013 Rabaa massacre
  - Rabia sign, hand gesture ("R4BIA") of Muslim Brotherhood supporters
