= Egypt–Serbia relations =

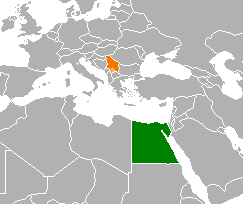
- Egypt: Serbia

Diplomatic mission
- Egyptian embassy, Belgrade: Serbian embassy, Cairo

Egypt and Serbia maintain diplomatic relations established in 1908. From 1918 to 2006, Egypt maintained relations with the Kingdom of Yugoslavia, the Socialist Federal Republic of Yugoslavia (SFRY), and the Federal Republic of Yugoslavia (FRY) (later Serbia and Montenegro), of which Serbia is considered shared (SFRY) or sole (FRY) legal successor.

== History ==
Egypt and Serbia have both been part of the Ottoman Empire and have fought against them. While Egypt did recognize Kosovo as an independent state, it still keeps good relations with Serbia due to a long history of bilateral relations.

== Resident diplomatic missions ==
- Egypt has an embassy in Belgrade.
- Serbia has an embassy in Cairo.

== See also ==
- Foreign relations of Egypt
- Foreign relations of Serbia
- Egypt–Yugoslavia relations
- Yugoslavia and the Non-Aligned Movement
- Yugoslavia and the Organisation of African Unity
