= Hossam El-Gheriany =

Egyptian judge (born 1941)

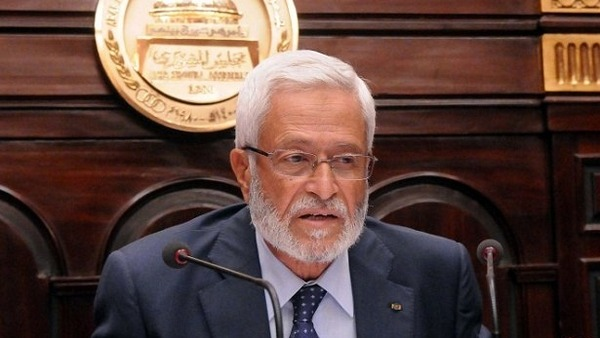
Chancellor Mohamed Hossam El Din El Gharyani

Hossam El-Gheriany (born 1941) is an Egyptian judge. Winning recognition as a champion of judicial independence in the regime of President Mubarak, he became head of the Supreme Judicial Council and the Court of Cassation. Today he also heads the Constituent Assembly of Egypt and is president of the National Council for Human Rights.

== Life ==
Born in Sharqiya Governorate in the Nile Delta, Hossam El-Gheriany gained a BA in law from the University of Alexandria in 1962. He worked for the public prosecutor's office for twelve years, witnessing Nasser's 1969 attack on the judiciary. He became a judge in 1974. Gaining varied experience as a judge - including two years in Libya and sometime in the United Arab Emirates - he became a chancellor in Egypt's Court of Cassation in 1986.

In 1986 Hossam El-Gheriany, Yahya al-Refai and Ahmed Mekky organized a conference, attended by President Mubarak, calling for the independence of the judiciary. In 2005 he wrote a report criticizing illegal interventions by the government in amending the way the president is elected. He criticized Mubarak for rigging the referendum over the multi-candidate presidential election of 2005, as well as the subsequent parliamentary election. After Mubarak's regime referred two judges to a disciplinary board for their "outspoken criticism", Gheriani mobilized judges in their support.

Elected to the Constituent Assembly of Egypt, Gheriany was nominated president of the assembly at its first meeting on 18 June 2012. A week later he threatened resignation, holding and winning a vote of confidence on his Constituent Assembly presidency. In September 2012 the Shura Council appointed Gheriany President of the National Council for Human Rights.
