= National Council for Human Rights =

Organization

- Formation: 19 June 2003
- Type: National human rights institution Nonprofit organization
- Purpose: Human rights
- Headquarters: Cairo
- Region served: Egypt
- President: Ambassador Dr. Ahmed Ihab Gamaleldin
- Website: http://www.nchr.eg/

The National Council for Human Rights (NCHR; Egyptian Arabic: المجلس القومي لحقوق الإنسان, al-Majlis al-Qawmī li-Ḥuqūq al-Insān) is Egypt’s national human rights institution. Established in 2003, it is mandated to promote and protect human rights in Egypt.[1] The Council publishes annual reports on the human rights situation in the country.[2]

Former United Nations Secretary-General Boutros Boutros-Ghali played a significant role in the establishment of the Council[3] and served as its president until 2012.[4][5] He was succeeded that year by judge Hossam El-Gheriany, who headed the Council during the presidency of Mohamed Morsi. Following Morsi’s removal from office in 2013, the Council was reconstituted, and Mohamed Fayek was appointed president.

In 2021, following the expiration of the previous Council’s term, the Egyptian Parliament selected Moushira Khattab as president. Her appointment, along with the new Council’s composition, was approved by President Abdel Fattah el-Sisi. In 2025, Khattab resigned, and the Council’s vice president, Ambassador Mahmoud Karem, assumed the presidency on an interim basis for the remainder of the Council’s term.

In March 2026, a new Council was formed, with Ambassador Ahmed Ehab Gamaleldin appointed president and Mohamed Anwar El-Sadat appointed vice president.

== History ==
While the NCHR maintains that it operates independently, other organizations, such as the Cairo Institute for Human Rights Studies, have expressed skepticism for the NCHR's affiliation with the Shura Council and the government's role in selecting members in the organization. In its 2009 Human Rights Report on Egypt, the United States State Department described the NCHR as a "consultative subsidiary of the Shura Council," but recognized that the NCHR's 2008/2009 annual report highlighted the human rights abuses by the Egyptian government, such as the imposition of a state of emergency, mistreatment of arrested citizens, weak counterterrorism laws, and restrictions on political parties and NGOs.

In 2007, the NCHR accused the Egyptian government of fraud during a national referendum, with Egyptian opposition groups urging citizens to boycott the referendum. The NCHR reported that the Egyptian government forced public workers to vote and restricted access to polling station from outside monitors. The Egyptian government reported that 75.9% voted for the constitutional amendments, although only 27% of voters participated in the referendum.

In 2008, the NCHR investigated the incidents at the Monastery of Saint Fana and highlighted the event in a report focused on the increase in sectarian violence in Egypt.

In the aftermath of the ouster of former president Hosni Mubarak, a committee organized by the NCHR found Mubarak, former interior minister Habib el-Adly, and others in the National Democratic Party responsible for the deaths of peaceful protesters during the uprisings preceding Mubarak's resignation. However, this report was met with criticism from those who believe that Mubarak should be held criminally, in addition to politically, responsible for violence against protesters

== See also ==
- Human rights in Egypt
- Persecution of Copts
