= El Sharq =

Television channel

El Sharq قناة الشرق
- Country: Egypt
- Headquarters: Istanbul, Turkey

Programming
- Language: Arabic

Ownership
- Owner: Ayman Nour

History
- Launched: 2014

Links
- Website: elsharq.tv; elsharqtv.org

El Sharq (Arabic: الشرق) is an Egyptian opposition TV channel owned by Ayman Nour and based in Istanbul, Turkey.

== History ==
El Sharq channel was launched on April 25, 2014, with the slogan “Truth and Hope.” Bassem Khafaji, the President of the National Political Academy, chaired its board of directors. Ownership then transferred to Ayman Nour, the leader of the El-Ghad Party, in August 2015.

El Sharq contributed to publishing leaks regarding the leadership of the 2013 coup in Egypt. Journalist Moataz Matar reported on his show "With Motaz" that interference with the broadcast of El Sharq channel was a result of revealing an audio recording of a call between Major General Abbas Kamel and Attorney General Hisham Barakat about the son of journalist Mohamed Hassanein Heikal. The channel is critical of President Abdel Fattah Al-Sisi's rule of Egypt.

The primary frequency was jammed by an unknown source in mid-November 2015, and Nour confirmed that the Board of Directors decided to rely on the reserve frequency. In 2017, while exiled in Turkey, Nour was sentenced in absentia to five years in prison for "spreading false news."

The channel was closed on January 16, 2018, until further notice. However, following the financial demands of technical and media staff, mediators reconciled between the board of directors and a group of staff members, and the channel resumed broadcasting on January 25, 2018.

== Programs ==
- With Motaz (مع معتز).
- The Egyptian Street (الشارع المصرى).
- El Sharq Today (الشرق اليوم).
- Share (شير) .
- برنامج إيه الحكايه

== Staff ==
- Moataz Matar
- Hisham Abdullah
- Omar Alshal
- Doaa Hassan
- Hesham Abdel Hamid
- Emad Albeheery
- Ahmed Atwan

== See also ==
- Mekameleen TV
- Egyptian revolution of 2011
- 2013 Egyptian coup d'état
