= Moataz Matar =

Egyptian journalist and television host (born 1974)

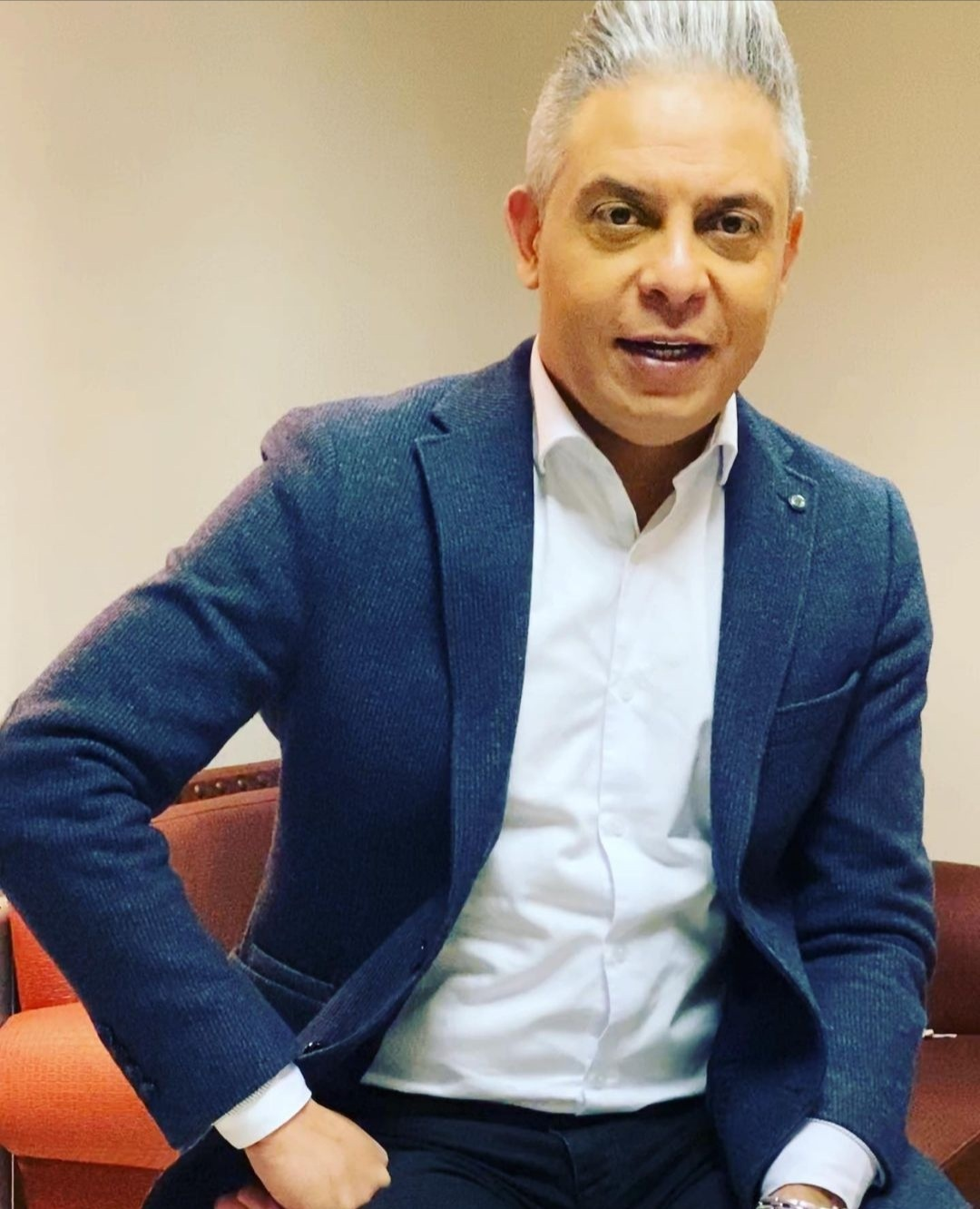
- Born: July 4, 1974 (age 51); Cairo, Egypt
- Occupation: Journalist
- Years active: 2010-present

Moataz Matar (Arabic: معتز مطر) (Note: pronounced [moʕˈtæz.ze‿ˈmɑtˤɑr]) is an Egyptian journalist who became famous after the 2011 revolution thanks to his program Mu'taz broadcast on El-Sharq satellite channel. He is known for his harsh criticism of the Egyptian government after the 2013 coup d'état, as well as the deterioration of the political situation in the Arab World in general.

== Career ==
He started his career in a radio station in Egypt called the youth and sports program and then he moved to the "ART”, an Egyptian channel in the early 2000s where he worked with the Egyptian team Al Ahly where he travelled with them to different places throughout the world and escorted them to their matches and championships that program was called "Al Abtal fel Adghal” he made this program also on Al-Ahly TV channel.

He also had a career in sports in "Modern" channel where he was a commentator on football matches. He worked in politics in 2010, before then during 2005-2009 worked as a sports media in the networks of art and modern, and after the January 25 revolution. The program of the station of Egypt on the Modern freedom channel of the modern network until left in February 2012 because of (cut off the sound for no reason) and missed a long time and then returned to present a program of the same name on the channel Misr 25 Muslim Brotherhood and continued for several months until he left the channel because The channel intervened in program policies, and then returned after the coup to present a program (with Moataz) on El-Sharq.

== Controversies ==
On 8 July 2015, the Egyptian Minor Offenses Court of Dokki sentenced Moataz Matar and his colleague Mohamed Nasser Ali in absentia to 10 years' imprisonment for attempting to "overthrow the regime, instigate the revolt against state institutions and apology for violence against the army and the police".

On 5 June 2016, the same court sentenced the two men in absentia to two years imprisonment and a fine of £E5,000 for instigating rebellion and spreading rumors against the armed forces, police and state institutions, and for making fun of President Abdel Fattah el-Sisi.

On 11 November, 2023, the United Kingdom Home Office placed Matar on a watchlist and revoked his visa, thereby preventing his re-entry to the United Kingdom. The Home Office did this following Matar's participation in pro-Palestinian protests and for expressing support for Hamas.

As of 6 January, 2024, Matar has resumed broadcasting on his Al-Shuob TV Channel. A day before resuming broadcasting Matar stated on his YouTube channel that his team found three locations across the world that they would be able to broadcast from at any given time. It is unclear where Matar currently resides.

== See also ==
- El Sharq TV
