= CAC =

CAC may refer to:

== Arts ==
- California Arts Council, an agency for advancing California through the arts and creativity
- Campbelltown Arts Centre, multidisciplinary contemporary arts centre south-west of Sydney, Australia
- Comics Arts Conference, a scholarly conference associated with Comic-Con International
- Contemporary Arts Center, an art museum in Cincinnati, Ohio
- Ciutat de les Arts i les Ciències (City of Arts and Sciences), a cultural and architectural complex in Valencia, Spain

== Business and finance ==
- Central Arbitration Committee
- CAC 40, a French stock market index
- Cotation Assistée en Continu, an electronic trading system used at the French stock exchange
- Capital account convertibility, a fiscal policy based on conducting transactions of local financial assets into foreign financial assets freely
- Collective action clause, a clause that allows a supermajority of bondholders to agree a debt restructuring that is legally binding on all holders of the bond
- Corporate Affairs Commission, Nigeria, a body that regulates companies in Nigeria
- Customer acquisition cost, the amount of money a business needs to spend to get an additional customer

== Corporate ==
- Call Aircraft Company, an aircraft manufacturer in the United States
- Certified Acceptance Corporation, a coin grading service
- Cessna Aircraft Company, an American aircraft manufacturer
- Champion Aircraft Corporation, an American aircraft manufacturer
- Chengdu Aircraft Corporation, an aircraft manufacturer in China
- Chugach Alaska Corporation, an Alaska Native regional corporation
- Colonial Ammunition Company, a New Zealand ammunition company
- Commonwealth Aircraft Corporation, an Australian aircraft manufacturer
- Conquest Airlines (ICAO airline designator)
- Consolidated Aircraft Corporation, an American aircraft manufacturer
- Copa Airlines Colombia

== Education ==
- Cairo American College, a school in Cairo, Egypt
- Coomera Anglican College, a school in Queensland, Australia
- Carmel Adventist College, a school in Western Australia, Australia
- Christian Alliance College, a middle school in Tuen Mun, Hong Kong

=== United States ===
- Central Arizona College, a community college in Coolidge, Arizona
- Commissioner's Academic Challenge, a Florida high school academic tournament
- Central Arkansas Christian Schools, a school system in North Little Rock, Arkansas
- Congressional App Challenge, a science and app challenge for all congressional districts in the U.S.

== Military ==
- U.S. Army Coast Artillery Corps, a U.S. Army corps
- Casualty Assistance Center, assists to next-of-kin of critically injured, ill or deceased U.S. Army soldiers, retirees, and veterans
- Combined Action Company, a joint unit of the Combined Action Program of U.S. Marines and South Vietnamese Regional Forces during the Vietnam war
- United States Army Combined Arms Command, a component of the Transformation and Training Command
- Canadian Armoured Corps, renamed in 1945 to Royal Canadian Armoured Corps
- Canadian Aviation Corps, the predecessor to the Royal Canadian Air Force
- Common Access Card, a U.S. military identification card
- Colombian armed conflict (1964–present), an internal war in Colombia

== Politics and religion ==
- Campaign Against Censorship, a UK pressure group that opposes censorship
- Catholic Apostolic Church, Christian denomination
- Central Advisory Commission, a political commission of the People's Republic of China
- Central Advisory Council, a body set up by the Imperial Japanese Army in the occupied Dutch East Indies
- Central Asian Commonwealth, an organization later renamed to Organization of Central Asian Cooperation
- Constitutional Accountability Center, a Washington, D.C. think tank
- CPSU Central Auditing Commission, an organ of the Communist Party of the Soviet Union
- Christians Against the Coup, an Egyptian political movement opposing the recent 2013 coup d'état in Egypt
- Christ Apostolic Church
- Church at Charlotte, an evangelical free church in Charlotte, NC
- Cyberspace Administration of China, a government agency of the People's Republic of China
- shortform for geographic region Central Asia and (the) Caucasus

== Science and technology ==
- Calcium carbide, a chemical compound
- Call Admission Control, a concept in voice over IP networking
- Air carbon arc cutting, an arc cutting process
- Citric acid cycle, a series of chemical reactions in cells that use oxygen in respiration
- Codex Alimentarius Commission, an organisation which maintains food standards
- Common Access Card, smart card used by the Active Duty United States Defense personnel
- Criteria air contaminants, a group of air pollutants
- Charge air cooler, part of an internal combustion engine
- Carrier access code
- Система Аварийного Спасения (transliteration from the Russian alphabet: Sistema Avariynogo Spaseniya, SAS), the Soyuz launch escape system
- CAC, a codon for the amino acid histidine
- CaC, an acronym for "configuration as code"

== Medicine ==
- Coronary Artery Calcium

== Sports and games ==
- Cardiff Athletic Club, a Cardiff-based multi sport organisation
- Castles and Crusades, a role-playing game
- Cauliflower Alley Club, a wrestling and boxing organization
- Commonwealth Athletic Conference, a high school athletic conference in Massachusetts, United States
- Confédération Africaine de Cyclisme (African Cycling Confederation), a confederation of governing bodies for cycling in Africa
- Córdoba Athletic Club, an Argentine sports club
- Club Atlético Chascomús, an Argentine sports club
- Capital Athletic Conference, former name of the US intercollegiate athletic conference now known as the Coast to Coast Athletic Conference
- Central American and Caribbean Games, a multi-sport regional championships event
- Command & Conquer, a series of video games
- Cricket Australia Cup, now the Futures League, an Australian cricket competition
- Club Athlétique Canadien, a Montreal-based ice hockey team
- Copa América Centenario
