= 2015 Cairo bombing =

2015 Cairo bombing may refer to:

- 2015 bombing of the Italian consulate in Cairo
- 2015 Heliopolis bombing/Assassination of Hisham Barakat
- 2015 Cairo Supreme Court bombing
