= Egyptian coup d'état =

Egyptian coup d'état may refer to:

- Egyptian Revolution of 1952
- 2013 Egyptian coup d'état
