= Mekameleen TV =

Mekameleen TV قناة مكملين
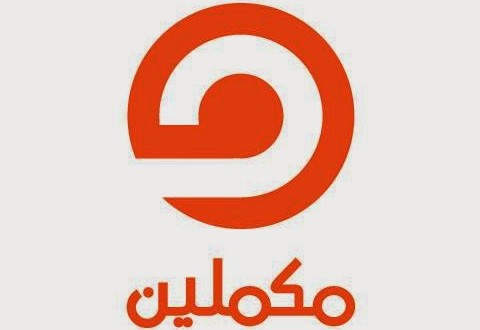
- Country: Egypt
- Broadcast area: MENA
- Headquarters: Istanbul, Turkey

Programming
- Language(s): Arabic
- Picture format: HDTV

History
- Launched: 2013

Links
- Website: www.mekameleen.tv

Mekameleen TV (Arabic: قناة مكملين) is an Egyptian opposition TV channel broadcast on Qatar owned satellite Es'hail 2. It is based in Istanbul, Turkey.

== History ==
The channel published a leaked audio recording of Abdel Fattah el-Sisi in 2015. In 2017 Mekameleen TV published a leaked video of Egyptian soldiers killing unarmed men from the Sinai Peninsula and placing weapons beside their bodies.

== See also ==
- El Sharq
- 2013 Egyptian coup d'état
