= Rashad al-Bayumi =

Egyptian politician

Rashad al-Bayumi (Arabic: رشاد البيومى), (often transliterated as "al-Bayoumi") is one of the leaders of the Egyptian Muslim Brotherhood, his appointment pending approval by the Islamist organization's guidance bureau.

Al-Bayumi, a Cairo University professor and longtime Brotherhood member, was arrested in 2006 for his membership in the banned group.

He was expected to be elected in brotherhood election by brother elected DR. Mohammed Badie as a general leader to the MB organization in 2010, following the term of previous leader Mohammed Mahdi Akef.

After the 2013 Egyptian coup, Egypt's new prosecutor general Hisham Barakat ordered his assets to be frozen.
