= Safwat Hegazi =

Egyptian imam

Safwat Hegazi صفوت حجازي
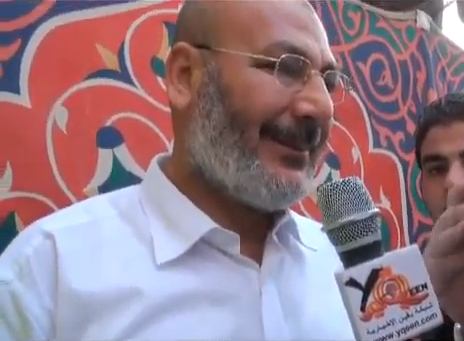
- Born: 11 April 1963 (age 63)
- Education: Alexandria University
- Occupations: Imam politician

Safwat Hegazi (sometimes written Safwat Hijazi; Arabic: صفوت حجازى, IPA: [ˈsˤɑfwɑt ħeˈɡæːzi]; born 11 April 1963) is an Egyptian imam and television preacher who is on the list of "Individuals banned from the UK for stirring up hatred". A supporter of Mohamed Morsi, he was arrested after the 2013 Egyptian coup d'état.

== Career and views ==
Safwat Hegazy is a graduate of the Faculty of Agriculture, Cairo University.

Hegazy was investigated in Egypt in 2006 for issuing a fatwā calling for the death of visiting Israeli officials. He later withdrew the fatwa. Safwat Hegazy has had several court cases brought against him for allegedly insulting women who do not wear the "niqab" full face cover for women; one court case was dropped when he and his lawyers settled out of court.

In January 2009, on an Al-Nas TV show hosted by himself, responding to criticism from Yigal Carmon, Higazi declared: "I am an anti-Semite, I hate Zionism. ... If not for the Arab rulers, we would devour Jews with our teeth."

In 2009, he declared in a television interview that Buddhism, Zoroastrianism and the Baháʼí Faith were not religions but were "man-made schools of thought". He said Baháʼís were a current danger and fought alongside Zionists in 1948.

The government of the United Kingdom declared in 2009 that he is considered to be engaging in unacceptable behaviour by glorifying terrorist violence.

In an address that aired Al-Nas TV on July 11, 2010, Safwat advised parents that "our children sit in front of the computer and the playstation, and play games that will never lead them to wage Jihad."

In 2012, Safwat launched MB candidate Mohamed Morsi's campaign. In his speech to a crowd of hundreds of thousands of Egyptians, Safwat emphasized that Morsi will lead Egypt's campaign to restore the "United States of the Arabs" or "Caliphate" with Jerusalem as its capital, and urged listeners to "awake Jews from their slumber" and chanted that they would march as martyrs toward Jerusalem. During the June 2013 protests against Morsi, Hegazy threatened opposition protesters saying "whoever sprays Morsi with water will be sprayed with blood."

After Morsi was removed from office by the military coup, prosecutors ordered Safwat's arrest on 10 July 2013. On 14 July 2013, Egypt's military-appointed prosecutor general Hisham Barakat ordered his assets to be frozen. He was arrested on 21 August 2013. On 14 September 2013, Hegazy was acquitted on charges of "inciting violence" at the Muslim Brotherhood headquarters on 30 June 2013. Cairo Criminal Court on 7 December 2013 refused to return a verdict and recused itself in another case involving Hegazy and Mohamed Beltagy citing "embarrassment" as a reason for its decision.

On the 4th of February, 2024, he has been sentenced to death.

== See also ==
- Muslim Brotherhood in Egypt
- Al-Nas (TV station)
