= Arab League–Egypt relations =

- Arab League: Egypt

Arab League–Egypt relations refer to the political, economic, and cultural ties between the League of Arab States and the Arab Republic of Egypt.

== History ==
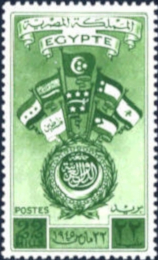
Arab League of states establishment memorial stamp. Showing flags of the 8 establishing countries: Kingdom of Egypt, Kingdom of Saudi Arabia, the Mutawakkilite Kingdom of Yemen (North Yemen), Syrian Republic, Hashemite Kingdom of Iraq, Hashemite Kingdom of Jordan, Lebanese Republic and Palestine

Egypt was one of the founding members of the Arab League when it was formed in Cairo on 22 March 1945 initially with six members: Egypt, Iraq, Transjordan (renamed Jordan in 1949), Lebanon, Saudi Arabia, and Syria. On 26 March 1979, Egypt was suspended from the Arab League due to the Egypt–Israel peace treaty; it was later readmitted on 23 May 1989. At a 2015 summit in Egypt, member states agreed in principle to form a joint military force.
