= Mohamed Elbeltagy =

Egyptian physician and professor (born 1963)

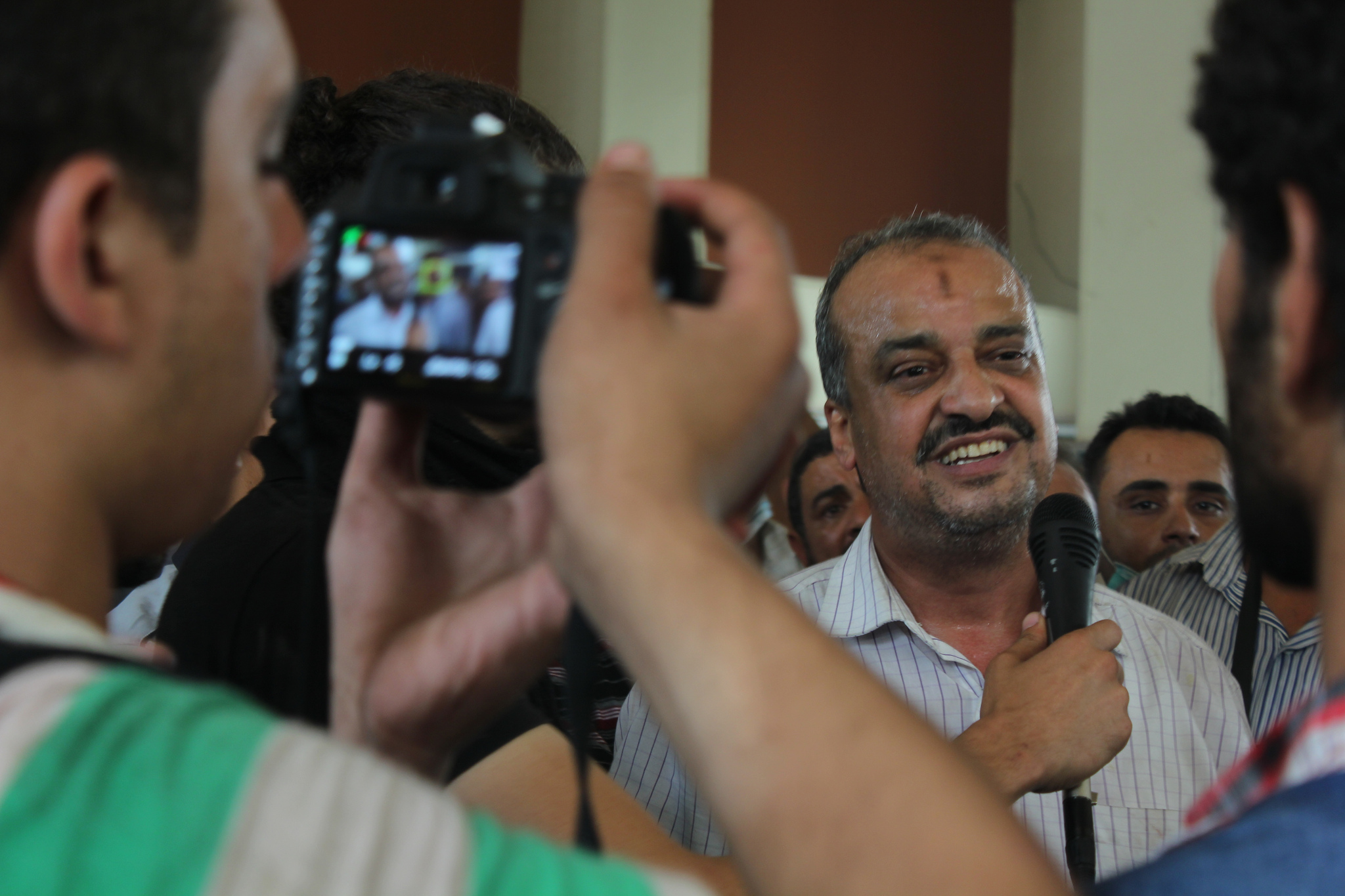
Mohamed Elbeltagy in 2014

Mohamed Elbeltagy (Arabic: محمد البلتاجي; born 1963) is an Egyptian physician, professor at Al-Azhar University and Muslim Brotherhood politician. He was a Member of Parliament from 2005 to 2010 and 2011 to 2012, and a member of the constituent assembly of 2012. He currently serves as the general secretary of the Freedom and Justice Party.

== Biography ==
He was on board the MV Mavi Marmara during the 2010 Gaza flotilla raid.

After the 2013 Egyptian coup d'état, prosecutors ordered Elbeltagy's arrest on 10 July 2013. On 14 July 2013, Egypt's military-appointed prosecutor general Hisham Barakat ordered Elbeltagy's assets to be frozen.

Mohamed Elbeltagy's 17-year-old daughter Asmaa Elbeltagy was killed when the Egyptian security forces stormed two protest camps occupied by supporters of deposed president Mohamed Morsi in Cairo. She was shot in the back and chest.

Elbeltagy was arrested on 29 August 2013 by security forces in Giza, along with former labor minister Khaled Azhari and Jamal al-Ishri, another brotherhood official. He was then sent to Tora Prison, where other high ranking Brotherhood officials are incarcerated. On 29 October 2013, a three-judge panel at Cairo Criminal Court stepped down from the proceedings, citing "uneasiness" over the trial. On 7 December 2013, Cairo's Criminal Court refused to return a verdict and recused itself in a case involving Elbeltagy and Safwat Hegazi citing "embarrassment" as a reason for its decision. On 11 December 2013, a second panel of judges withdrew from the trial. On 21 April 2015, a guilty verdict was returned against Elbeltagy over violence against protesters, and he was sentenced along with former President Mohamed Morsi and several other Muslim Brotherhood leaders to 20 years in prison. Elbeltagy had sentenced in 6 other cases to between 3 and 25 years in prison. In 2021 the criminal court sentenced him along with 11 others to death.

Mohamed Elbeltagy's son Anas Beltagy was arrested on 30 December 2013. Courts acquitted him in several cases, but he still detained on remand till today for almost 10 years.
