= Abdel Meguid Mahmoud =

Egyptian Attorney General

Attorney General of Egypt
- In office 2006–2013
- Succeeded by: Hisham Barakat

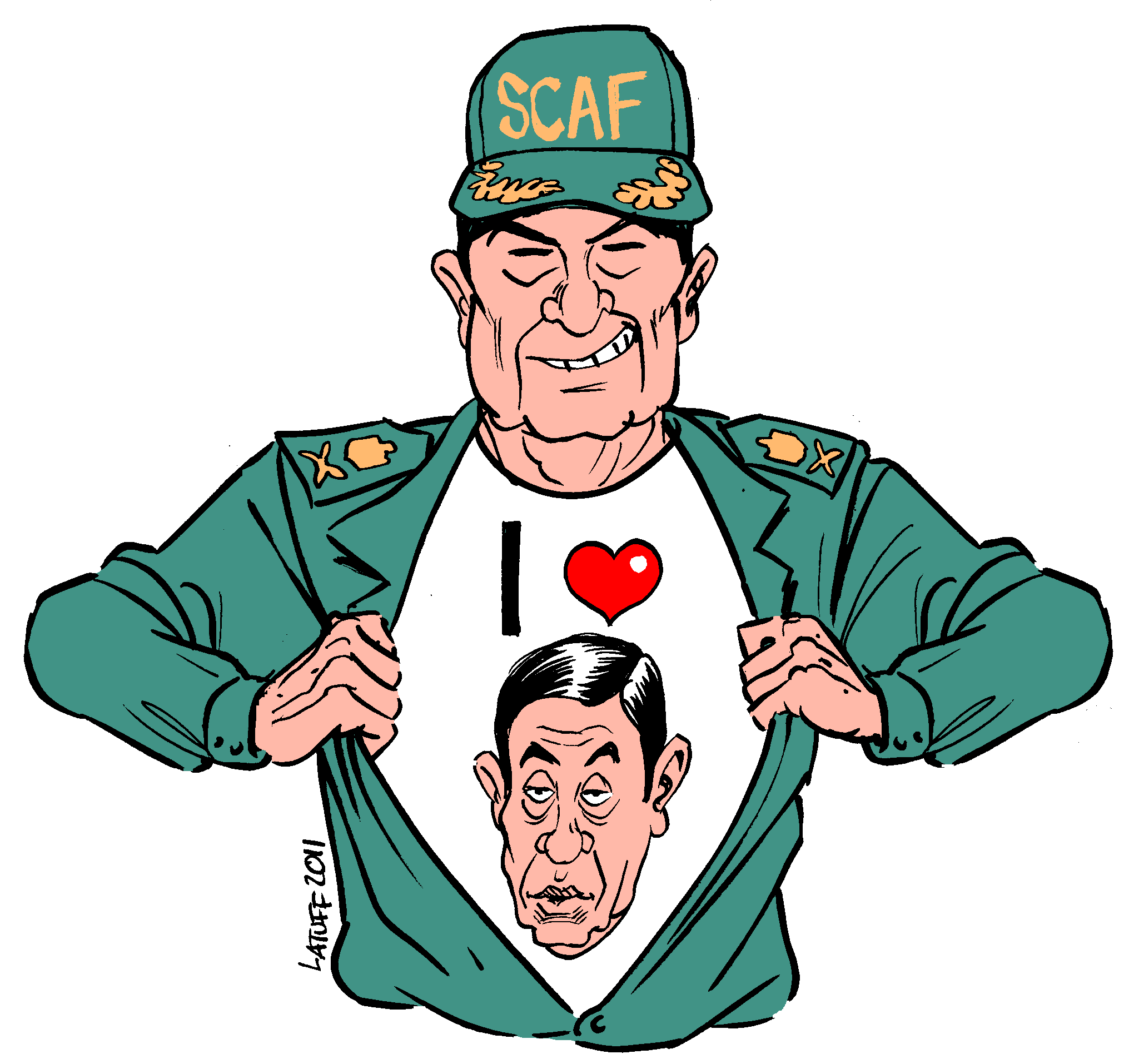
"SCAF loves corrupt attorney general Meguid Mahmoud", by Carlos Latuff

Abdel Meguid Mahmoud (Arabic: عبد المجيد محمود; born 1946) was the Egyptian Attorney General from 2006 to 5 July 2013. He was removed from office by President Mohamed Morsi on 22 November 2012 after a constitutional declaration made by the president. On 2 July 2013, the Egyptian Court of Cassation deemed his removal illegal and reinstated him again as the general prosecutor of Egypt. On 3 July 2013, President Morsi was deposed in a coup d'état by the military and Mahmoud subsequently resigned on 5 July 2013 shortly after being reinstated to "avoid the embarrassment of making judicial decisions against those who removed me from office."
