= Al-Hafez =

Egyptian Salafi Islamic channel

Al-Hafez (Arabic 'the Protector') is a Salafi Islamic channel from Egypt that promotes teaching and recitation of the Quran. In addition, as a reaction to the Egyptian Revolution of 2011, the channel promotes the political orientation of Islamist parties and serves as a platform to attack their opponents.

== Goals ==
- Memorization of the Quran and implanting it into the hearts of Muslims
- Teaching and learning the Quran and its provisions
- Removing suspicions about the Quran and keeping it from misrepresentation and distortion
- Interest in the study of the Hadith

== Programming ==
Channel programs revolve around the following topics:

- Memorization of the Quran and its recitation
- Quran miracles in all fields
- Sunnah
- Clarification of doubts, revealing falsehoods, and responding to them
- Tales of memorizing and those that have mastered the memorization of the Quran
- Calligraphy
- Quran and life
- Ethics of the Quran
- Defense of the Muslim Brotherhood and attack on its opponents in a way seen by some as inappropriate

== Elham Shahin lawsuit ==
Al-Hafez was sued following the broadcasting of offensive language. The reason for this was that Atef Abel Rasheed, the presenter of the show Fee el-Mezan, hosted two sheikhs whose language and opinions were seen as being offensive: Sheikh Abdallah Badr, who slandered Egyptian actress Elham Shahin, and Salafi Sheikh Mahmoud Shaaban, who issued a fatwa on air calling for the assassination of opposition leaders. Following Badr's comments about her on air, Shahin filed a lawsuit with the Administrative Court of the State Council, demanding that Al-Hafez be shut down and its licenses revoked. Badr, a controversial preacher notorious for the coarse language and insults he directs at opponents, had described Shahin on his show as being "promiscuous, naked, and lascivious" and also called her a "prostitute" and "infidel", according to clips shown to the court by the public prosecution. In December 2012, the Zaweya al-Hamra Court sentenced him to one year in prison and ordered him to pay a LE20,000 fine. Badr announced that he will not make any more media appearances and will focus solely on preaching.
