= Hisham Barakat =

Egyptian prosecutor general (1950–2015)

Prosecutor General of Egypt
- In office 10 July 2013 – 29 June 2015
- President: Adly Mansour (Acting); Abdel Fattah el-Sisi
- Deputy: Zakaria Abdel-Aziz Osman
- Preceded by: Abdel Meguid Mahmoud
- Succeeded by: Zakaria Abdel-Aziz Osman (Acting)

Personal details
- Born: Hisham Muhammad Zaki Barakat; 21 November 1950
- Died: 29 June 2015 (aged 64) Heliopolis, Cairo, Egypt
- Party: Independent

Hisham Muhammad Zaki Barakat (Arabic: هشام محمد زكي بركات, romanized: Hišām Muḥammad Zakī Barakāt; 21 November 1950 – 29 June 2015) was Attorney General of Egypt from 2013 to 2015. During his term as state prosecutor, he was responsible of thousands of controversial prosecutions, including several widely deemed politically motivated resulting in death sentences for hundreds of Muslim Brotherhood members and supporters of deposed Egyptian President Mohamed Morsi. He was assassinated in a car bombing on 29 June 2015.

== Early life ==
Barakat graduated from Cairo University with a B.A. in Law in 1973. Appointed to the Public Prosecution, he joined the judiciary and worked in courts of first instance and appeal courts. He became the head of the technical office of the president of the Cairo Appeals Court.

== Prosecutor General ==
Barakat was appointed as Prosecutor-General by Egypt's interim President Adly Mansour after Abdel Meguid Mahmoud announced his resignation from the post in the aftermath of the 2013 Egyptian coup d'état. Barakat was sworn in on 10 July 2013.

On 14 July 2013, Barakat ordered the freezing of assets of 14 prominent Egyptian Islamists: Muslim Brotherhood supreme guide Mohammed Badie, and his deputies Khairat el-Shater, Mahmoud Ezzat and Rashad Baioumy; Mahdi Akef, the Brotherhood's former supreme guide; Mohamed Saad al-Katatny, head of the Freedom and Justice Party, FJP deputy leader Essam al-Erian and general secretary Mohamed al-Beltagy; Salafi preacher Safwat Hegazy; Essam Sultan, vice president of the Wasat Party; Assem Abdel Maged, member of the Jamaa Islamiya Shura Council; Hazem Salah Abu Ismail, Flag Party president; Tarek al-Zomor, Building and Development Party secretary; and former MP Mohammed al-Omda.

On 18 December 2013, Barakat ordered the referral of deposed Egyptian President Mohamed Morsi to criminal court for charges of espionage in a statement under the title "The Biggest Case of Espionage in the History of Egypt". According to Barakat's investigations, the international organisation of the Muslim Brotherhood, allegedly aided by Hezbollah and Hamas, is accused of being the reason behind violence within Egypt; members are accused of intending to create a state of ultimate chaos after allegedly receiving media and military training in Gaza with the aim to implement jihadists in Sinai.

== Assassination ==
Barakat was assassinated in a car bombing on 29 June 2015 as he left his home in Heliopolis. According to security sources, the bomb was planted in a parked car and remotely detonated at 10:00 a.m., hitting Barakat's motorcade. After the bombing, Barakat was admitted to al-Nozha hospital where he was pronounced dead at 12:30 p.m. after surgery and the cause of death was stated as "ruptures in the lung and stomach, and internal bleeding". Five guards, two drivers and one civilian were injured during the attack.

The death of Barakat was widely grieved and condemned across Egypt. Hours after news of the assassination broke, all private satellite channels in Egypt suspended their programmes and mourned Barakat's death. On 30 June, Al Jazeera reported that Egyptian President Abdel Fattah el-Sisi announced that Rabaa Square would be renamed after Barakat. The square is the site of the August 2013 Rabaa massacre where more than 800 protesters were killed who were seeking the reinstatement of President Mohamed Morsi after he was deposed in a coup orchestrated by Sisi. This was later denied by sources at the presidency indicating that the naming of streets and squares is not within the purview of the president.

On 2 July, Egypt's public prosecution issued a gag order restraining media outlets from reporting updates on the investigation of the case. The gag order remained in effect until the conclusion of the investigation, while statements on the case and its updates were issued by the acting prosecutor-general's office.

In the aftermath of the assassination, Egyptian Foreign Minister Sameh Shoukry instructed all Egyptian Diplomatic Missions to open books of condolence.

On 17 June 2017, the Cairo Criminal Court sentenced 31 defendants of the 67 people charged to death in connection with Barakat's assassination in a preliminary judgement.

On 22 July 2017, the Cairo criminal court sentenced 28 people to death over Barakat's killing and handed 15 others each 25 years of jail sentences.

=== International response ===
France - The International Federation for Human Rights (FIDH), based in Paris, strongly condemned the assassination of Egypt’s public prosecutor, calling on the Egyptian authorities to ensure an “effective, independent and impartial” investigation and to uphold judicial standards and the rule of law without recourse to the death penalty.

United Kingdom - Amnesty International, based in London, criticized Egypt's broader use of the death penalty following Barakat’s death, warning that the rushed capital trials and executions could reflect a repressive backlash rather than a legitimate justice response.

United Nations - The UN Office of the High Commissioner for Human Rights urged Egypt to halt death row executions, including those linked to terror-related crimes like Barakat’s killing, in light of allegations of torture and forced confessions.

== See also ==
Similar cases of Muslim Brotherhood critiques and political adversaries assassinated in the region:

- Chokri Belaid
- Mohamed Brahmi
