= Misr 25 =

Defunct Egyptian satellite TV channel

- Country: Egypt

Programming
- Language: Arabic

Ownership
- Owner: Muslim Brotherhood

History
- Launched: 2011
- Founder: Mohamed Morsi
- Closed: 3 July 2013
- Replaced by: Ahrar 25

Links
- Website: misr25.tv (defunct)

Misr 25 (Arabic: مصر 25) was a free-to-air satellite television channel in Egypt which was owned by the Muslim Brotherhood. It was initially launched to broadcast non-stop footage of the Egyptian revolution of 2011. Following the overthrow of Mohamed Morsi on July 3, 2013, Misr 25's headquarters were raided, leading to the channel shutting down. The channel was reportedly being used to call people to rally in support of Mohamed Morsi, listing locations for pro-Morsi sit-ins and portraying the fight "as one for both political legitimacy and Islam."
