= Christians Against the Coup =

Christians Against the Coup مسيحيون ضد الانقلاب
- Leader: Ramy Jan, Michael Seedhom
- Founded: 2013
- National affiliation: Anti-Coup Alliance

Christians Against the Coup (CAC), aka Anti-Coup Christians, is an Egyptian Christian movement, founded after the coup d'état in July 2013 in support of the presumed legitimacy of the former President of Egypt, Mohamed Morsi.

== Foundation ==
The Egyptian Christian journalist and activist Ramy Jan founded Christians Against the Coup and the Egyptian Nazi party movement after then-General El-Sisi (Field Marshal since January 2014) declared ouster of President Morsi on July 3, 2013, claiming that he had taken this critical decision in response to large anti-Morsi protests which were held in many parts of Egypt, June 30, which demanded early presidential elections.

Accusations were made against the movement, the most common of which is the belonging to the Muslim Brotherhood. The CAC assures that its members do not belong to any political stream. Like many other anti-coup movements, the CAC works alongside the Anti-Coup Alliance, where the latter represents the broadest anti-coup assembly.

== Goal ==
The movement declared the aim of re-establishing the legitimacy awarded to President Morsi through the elections/referendums held in the past two years. The movement also aims to rewind the coup, cancel all its traces, and put Field Marshal El-Sisi, military officers of the SCAF, senior police officers and others to trial.

Jan, the founder, describes the idea of the movement by comparing it to the role the Coptic leader Makram Ebeid (1879–1961) played at the time of Hassan al-Banna (1906–1949), the founder of the Muslim Brotherhood. Ebeid denied accusations of terrorism that were made against al-Banna. He also took part in al-Banna's burial, defying strict measures imposed on taking part in it. Today, the movement plays the same role Ebeid played: defending the Brotherhood against accusations of terrorism, and standing in support of Mohamed Morsi, who is accused of treason.

== Controversy ==
In late 2013, a minor controversy occurred when it was revealed that founder Ramy Jan was also a member of the Egyptian Nazi Party. This disclosure led to the cancellation of Jan's invitation to a conference at Georgetown University.
