= New City Church =

Coordinates: 35.1334°N 80.8090°W

- New City Church
- Location: Charlotte, North Carolina
- Country: United States
- Denomination: Evangelical Free Church of America
- Website: www.newcity.us

History
- Founded: March 2019

New City Church is a multi-site church in Charlotte, North Carolina, United States. The church is a member of the Evangelical Free Church of America denomination. New City has two campuses, one in the SouthPark area of Charlotte and one on Monroe Road in the nearby suburb of Matthews. Weekend services are held on Sunday mornings at both locations. The church's mission is to "help people find & follow Jesus” Weekend services on both campuses average about 2,000 attendees.

== History ==
New City was formed in 2019, through the blending of Church at Charlotte (now the SouthPark congregation) and New Charlotte Church (now the Matthews congregation). New Charlotte Church was an Evangelical Presbyterian Church congregation founded in 2010, while Church at Charlotte was an EFCA congregation founded in 1973. The merged church joined the EFCA.
