= 2013 Egyptian coup d'état =

Military overthrow of Mohamed Morsi in Egypt

- Part of the Egyptian Crisis (2011–2014), the Arab Winter, the aftermath of the Egyptian Revolution, and the Qatar–Saudi Arabia diplomatic conflict
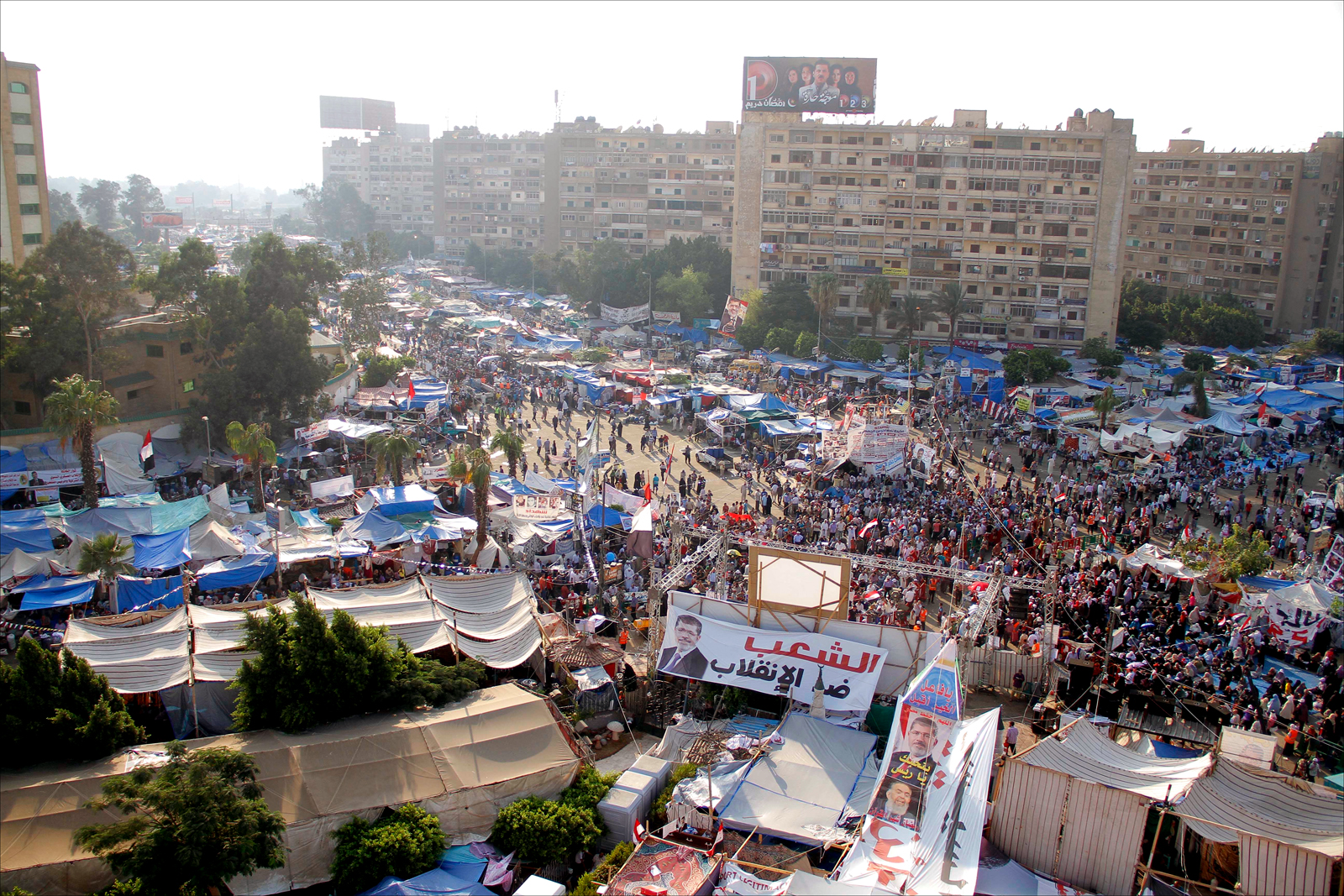
- Anti-coup demonstrations at Rabaa Square, 1 August 2013
- Date: 3 July 2013; 13 years ago
- Location: Egypt
- Caused by: June 2013 Egyptian protests
- Goals: Overthrow Mohamed Morsi and establish a new government
- Result: President Mohamed Morsi deposed by the Egyptian army: Constitution suspended, and a transitional roadmap declared; Democratic transition following the 2011 revolution interrupted, return to authoritarian military rule; Adly Mansour becomes interim president; Presidential elections are held and General Abdel Fattah El-Sisi is elected and becomes president.; Arrests and detention of Muslim Brotherhood leaders and members, including Morsi; Closure of perceived pro-Muslim Brotherhood media outlets; Dissolution of Shura Council; Escalation of militant attacks in the Sinai Peninsula; Increasing unrest and instability in response to coup; Temporary suspension of Egypt from the African Union; New presidential election held in 2014; Morsi and other Muslim Brotherhood figures jailed on various charges; Crackdown on the Muslim Brotherhood; Mohamed Morsi dies during his court trial on 17 June 2019

Parties
| Supreme Council of the Armed Forces; Egyptian Armed Forces; Egyptian National Police; Central Security Forces; Al-Azhar al-Sharif; Coptic Orthodox Church; Al-Nour Party; Nasserists; Supported by: United Arab Emirates | Egyptian Government: Muslim Brotherhood; Freedom and Justice Party; (Egypt) Pro-Morsi protesters Supported by: Turkey; Qatar |

Lead figures
| Abdel Fattah el-Sisi (Commander-in-Chief of the Armed Forces, Minister of Defense); Hosni Mubarak (Former President of Egypt); Sedki Sobhi (Chief of Staff of the Armed Forces); Mohamed Ibrahim (Minister of Interior); Ahmed el-Tayeb (Grand Imam of al-Azhar); Yunis Makhyun (Chairman of Al-Nour) Pope Tawadros II of Alexandria | Mohamed Morsi (President of Egypt, Supreme Commander of the Armed Forces); Hesham Qandil (Prime Minister of Egypt); Saad El-Katatni (Chairman of the FJP); Mohammed Badie (Leader of the Muslim Brotherhood); Khairat el-Shater (Deputy Leader of the Muslim Brotherhood) |

Casualties
- Deaths: 1,150+
- Injuries: 4,000+

On 3 July 2013, then-President of Egypt Mohamed Morsi was overthrown by a coup d'etat led by Egyptian army chief General Abdel Fattah el-Sisi, who led a coalition to remove Morsi from power and suspend the Egyptian Constitution of 2012. The move came after an ultimatum that the government "resolve its differences" with protesters during widespread national protests. Morsi and Muslim Brotherhood leaders were placed under house arrest and Chief Justice of the Supreme Constitutional Court Adly Mansour was declared interim president of Egypt. The announcement was followed by demonstrations and clashes between supporters and opponents of the move throughout Egypt.

There were mixed international reactions to the events. Most Arab leaders were generally supportive or neutral, with the exception of Qatar, Tunisia and the SNC who strongly condemned the military's actions. The US avoided describing the action as a coup. Other states either condemned or expressed concern over the removal of Morsi. Due to the regulations of the African Union regarding the interruption of constitutional rule by a member state, Egypt was suspended from that union.

Ensuing protests in favour of Morsi were violently suppressed culminating with the dispersal and massacre of pro-Morsi sit-ins on 14 August 2013, amid ongoing unrest; journalists and several hundred protestors were killed by police and military force. Muslim Brotherhood members claim 2,600 people were killed. Human Rights Watch documented a minimum of 904 deaths, describing it as crimes against humanity and "one of the world's largest killings of demonstrators in a single day in recent history," while the government puts the figure at 624.

== Background ==
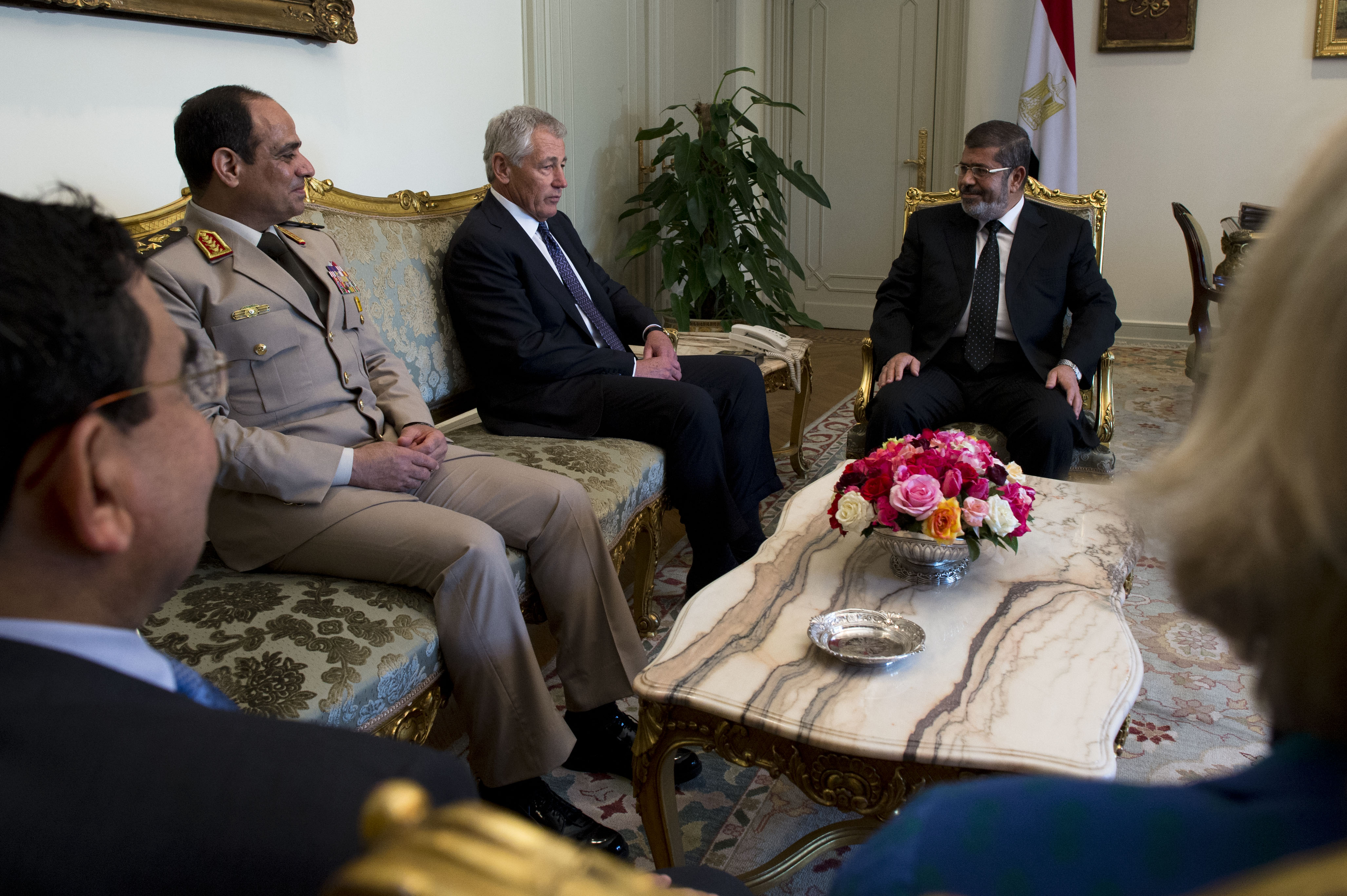
Then president Mohamed Morsi (right) and General el-Sisi (left) listen to visiting U.S. Secretary of Defense Chuck Hagel (center), during a meeting with U.S. officials on 24 April 2013. El-Sisi, chosen by Morsi to be the first post-Mubarak era Defense Minister, would later sanction the removal of Morsi from office.

In February 2011, Hosni Mubarak resigned after 18 days of mass demonstrations that ended his 29-year rule of Egypt. In July 2011, the caretaker government approved an election law, leading to the election of a Parliament in December 2011 – January 2012, and an advisory council in January–February 2012. An alliance led by the Freedom and Justice Party won the most seats in each election. An additional 25% of the members of the advisory council were to be appointed by the President. In June 2012, Mohamed Morsi won the presidential election with 51.73% of total votes to become the first democratically elected president of Egypt. In June 2012, prior to Morsi being sworn in as president, the Supreme Constitutional Court ruled that the election law was unconstitutional and ordered the elected bodies dissolved. After assuming office, President Morsi appointed additional members to the advisory council from 35 political parties and invited the elected bodies to meet to discuss the ruling of the court.

The elected parliament determined that the constitutional court did not have authority to dissolve an elected parliament, then referred the matter to the Court of Cassation. The elected parliament could not pass any laws, but the advisory council continued to give advice on proposed Presidential Decrees. Parliament also proceeded with the creation of a new constitutional committee to draft amendments to the Egyptian Constitution, replacing the committee created in March 2012 but dissolved by the constitutional court. Proposed constitutional amendments were approved in December 2012 by a national referendum. New elections were scheduled for April 2013 under a law approved in draft by the constitutional court, but were postponed to October 2013 to comply with a technical order of an administrative court.

In November 2012, following the protests against the Constitutional Declaration by Morsi, opposition politicians – including Mohamed ElBaradei, Amr Moussa and Hamdeen Sabahi, according to The Wall Street Journal – started holding confidential meetings with army leaders, in order to discuss ways of removing President Morsi.

On 28 April 2013, Tamarod was started as a grassroots movement to collect signatures to remove Morsi by 30 June. They called for peaceful demonstrations across Egypt especially in front of the Presidential Palace in Cairo. The movement was supported by the National Salvation Front, April 6 Youth Movement and Strong Egypt Party.

In a poll published by the Pew Research Center in May 2013, 54% of Egyptians approved of Morsi against a 43% who saw him negatively, while about 30% were happy with the direction of the country, 73% thought positively of the army and only 35% were content about local policy authorities. In the lead up to the protests, a Gallup poll indicated a drop in approval of the national government from 57% in November 2012 to 24% in June 2013. About a third of Egyptians said they were "suffering" and viewed their lives poorly.

At a conference on 15 June, Morsi called for foreign intervention in Syria. According to Yasser El-Shimy, an analyst with the International Crisis Group, this statement crossed "a national security red line." The army rebuked this statement the next day by stating that its only role was to guard Egypt's borders. Although the Egyptian constitution ostensibly declares the president as the supreme commander of the armed forces, the Egyptian military is independent of civilian control.

As the first anniversary of Morsi's presidential inauguration approached in 2013, his supporters such as the National Coalition for Supporting Legitimacy started demonstrations at multiple places including El-Hossari Mosque, El-Nahda Square, outside Cairo University, outside Al-Rayan Mosque in the posh suburb of Maadi, and in Ain Shams district. They had started open-ended rallies. The largest protest was planned for 30 June.

== Causes ==
The removal of Morsi from office by the coalition was a result of a coup d'état following protests, that were instigated by frustration with Morsi's year-long rule in which Egypt faced economic issues, energy shortages, lack of security, and diplomatic crises. Some of the issues that might have caused the protests and lead to the later removal of Morsi include:

- Claims by the National Salvation Front and other opposition organizations that there were irregularities in the 2012 referendum on changes to Egypt's constitution. Various members of the Constituent Assembly including church representatives subsequently withdrew due to their dissatisfaction with the content of the changes.
- Unprecedented economic crises including power, fuel and foreign currency shortages.
- Worsening state security with incidents including the murder of 16 border guards in Sinai, kidnappings and the blowing up of a gas pipeline supplying Israel and Jordan on numerous occasions.
- Egyptian Military economic interests. Estimates of the military's share of Egypt's economy range from 5% to 40% and include industries such as mining, real estate, farming and the production of household appliances. The military has long opposed modern economic policies such as privatization that threaten their position in the economy.
- Foreign interference: In 2015 secret audio recordings of President Abdel Fattah el-Sisi and members of his inner circle were leaked that indicated that during Morsi's presidency the UAE provided funds to the Egyptian Defense Ministry to launch a protest campaign against President Mohamed Morsi and funded the Tamarod protest movement. The recordings contained other highly controversial contents.

== Planning ==
Leaked tapes from the summer of 2013 that were later verified by J. P. French Associates recorded figures of the Egyptian military, including former General Abdel Fattah el-Sisi, suggesting that the Egyptian military was involved in the mass-protests preceding Morsi's ouster. In one of the leaked tapes, the generals are heard discussing rigging the legal case against Morsi, and in another, authorizing the withdrawal of a large sum of money for the army's use from the bank account of Tamarod, the ostensibly independent grassroots group that was organizing protests against President Morsi. The tapes also suggest high-level collusion between the coup plotters and the Government of the United Arab Emirates as the money that was to be transferred from Tamarod's account into the army's account was provided by the UAE. The tapes were first released on the Qatari-owned Egyptian Islamist channel Mekameleen, a fact that the Egyptian government says discredits the tapes as fakes. American officials later confirmed that the United Arab Emirates was indeed providing financial support for the protests against Morsi that preceded the military coup. There is also evidence on the support of the military coup plotters by the Egyptian economic elites. Egypt's Interior Ministry was seen as most influential in the lead-up to the coup d’état as a revenge for powers lost during the Egyptian revolution of 2011 according to a Reuters analysis.

== Events ==
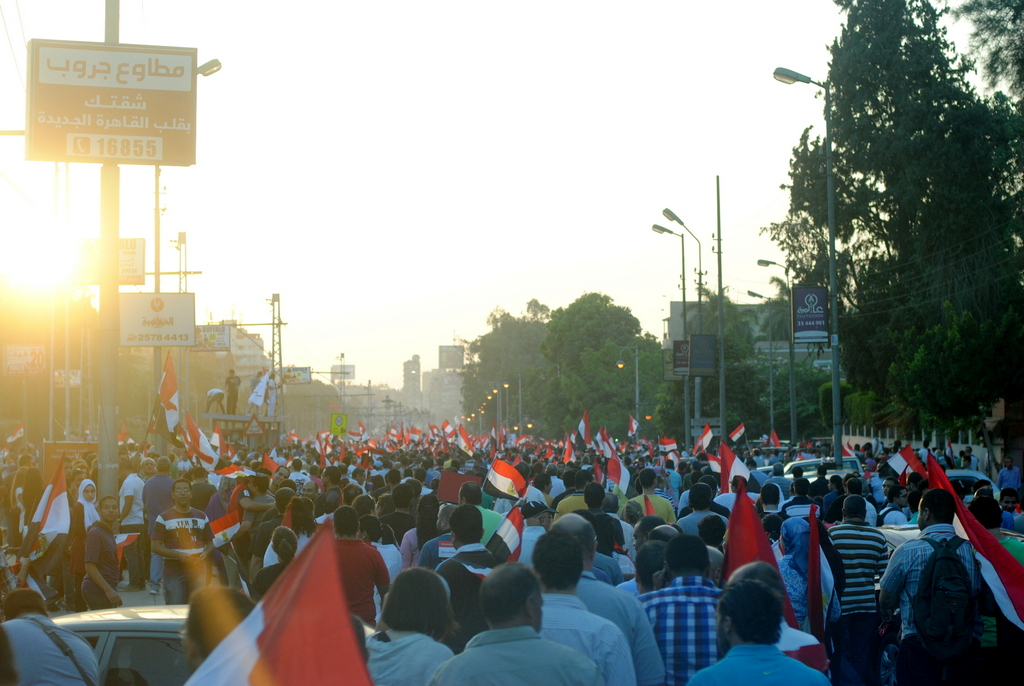
Anti-Morsi demonstrators marching in Cairo on 28 June

On 28 June, protests against Morsi started to build throughout Egypt including in such cities as Cairo, Alexandria, Dakahlia, Gharbiya and Aswan as a "warm up" for the massive protests expected on 30 June that were planned by Tamarod. Pro-Morsi and Muslim Brotherhood supporters started counter demonstrations at the Rabia Al-Adawiya Mosque in Nasr City.

Prior to the protests, Christians, particularly in Upper Egypt, received threats from pro-Morsi protestors, pressuring them not to take part in the protests. Sheikh Essam Abdulamek, a member of parliament's Shura Council, said in an interview on television that Christians should not participate in the protests and warned them "do not sacrifice your children [since the] general Muslim opinion will not be silent about the ousting of the president."

According to information that came out after President Morsi was removed from office, officials claimed that Morsi stopped working at the Egyptian Presidential Palace on 26 June and moved with his family to El-Quba Palace.

On 29 June, Tamarod claimed that it collected more than 22 million signatures from a petition calling for Morsi to step down as president.

On the other hand, the coup was preceded by the reconciliation of military and economic elites who organized shortages of fuel to provoke discontent of general population toward the Morsi administration.

=== 30 June: Anti-Morsi demonstrations ===
On 30 June, according to unverified military sources, 14 million protesters demonstrated across Egypt against Morsi. The protestors expressed their anger at the Brotherhood, which they accuse of hijacking Egypt's revolution and using electoral victories to monopolize power and impose Islamic law. However, independent observers raised concerns about the wild exaggeration of the number of actual anti-Morsi protestors, with one crowd statistical expert study indicating that a little over than 1 million people protested against Morsi across the whole country. Hundreds of thousands in support of Morsi gathered in Rabaa Square in Cairo and other cities. In Damietta, 250 fishing boat sailors demonstrated against Morsi by sailing through the Nile and chanting against him. The president moved that day from Quba Palace to the Republican Guard headquarters, while protesters thought he was at Ittihadeya Palace.

=== 1 July: Deadlines and options ===
External videos
- Helicopter view of the protesters

On 1 July, again more than 1 million demonstrators against Morsi gathered in Tahrir Square and outside the presidential palace, while other demonstrations were held in the cities of Alexandria, Port Said and Suez. Some police officers wearing their uniforms joined the anti-Morsi protests and chanted: "The police and the people are one." In clashes around the Muslim Brotherhood headquarters in Mokattam, eight people died. Their headquarters were ransacked and burned while protesters threw objects at windows and looted the building, making off with office equipment and documents. Tamarod gave President Mohamed Morsi until 2 July at 17:00 to resign or face a civil disobedience campaign. That was followed by the Egyptian Armed Forces issuing a 48-hour ultimatum that gave the country's political parties until 3 July to meet the demands of the Egyptian people. The Egyptian military also threatened to intervene if the dispute was not resolved by then. Four ministers also resigned on the same day: Tourism Minister Hisham Zazou (who previously offered to resign a few months earlier after Morsi appointed an Islamist member of al-Gama'a al-Islamiyya, the group allegedly responsible of the Luxor massacre, though the group has denied this charge, as governor of Luxor), Communication and IT Minister Atef Helmi, State Minister for Legal and Parliamentary Affairs Hatem Bagato, and State Minister for Environmental Affairs Khaled Abdel Aal, leaving the government with only members of the Freedom and Justice Party.

On the same day, Barack Obama called Morsi. The call went along the United States' vision that the only option out of the stressed situation would be to call for an early general presidential election in which Morsi is not a candidate. Morsi replied, "the Egyptian people decide," before he closed the line.

=== 2 July: Morsi speech ===
On 2 July, opponents and supporters of Morsi gathered in the capital, Cairo. The deadline set by the military for Morsi to solve the escalating political problem approached. The military said that they would intervene without eliminating either side, but they betrayed their word by engineering a coup the next day. Helicopters were also present around Cairo with armored vehicles taking up positions. On 3 July, clashes between protestors and local residents erupted around a pro-Morsi rally near Cairo University, leaving 18 people dead. Foreign Minister Mohamed Kamel Amr also resigned, in support of the anti-government protestors. The presidency rejected the Egyptian Army's 48-hour ultimatum, vowing that the president would pursue his own plans for national reconciliation to resolve the political crisis. Defense Minister Abdel Fattah el-Sisi was also said to have told Morsi that he would impose a military solution if a political one could not be found by the next day. Incidentally, the Court of Cassation ordered the reinstatement of former general prosecutor Abdel Maguid Mahmoud who was replaced with Talaat Abdallah following the constitutional declaration on 22 November 2012. The presidential spokesman and the spokesman for the cabinet resigned as well.

The newspaper Al-Ahram reported that if there were no political resolution, the military would suspend the constitution of Egypt and appoint a new council of experts to draft a new one, institute a three-person executive council, and appoint a prime minister from the military. Morsi's military advisor, Sami Hafez Anan, also resigned and said that the army would not "abandon the will of the people."

In a late-night television address Morsi declared that he would "defend the legitimacy of his elected office with his life." He added that "there is no substitute for legitimacy" as he vowed not to resign. Morsi accused supporters of Hosni Mubarak of exploiting the wave of protests to topple the government and fight democracy. After Morsi's statement, an official Facebook page of the Egyptian Armed Forces wrote a post under the title "The Last Hours" saying in response to Morsi: "The Supreme Commander in Chief of the Egyptian Armed Forces had mentioned before that it's better for us to die rather than seeing the Egyptian People being threatened or horrified, and we swear that we would sacrifice our lives and our blood for Egypt against every terrorist or extremist or ignorant. Long live Egypt."

=== 3 July: Day of Action ===
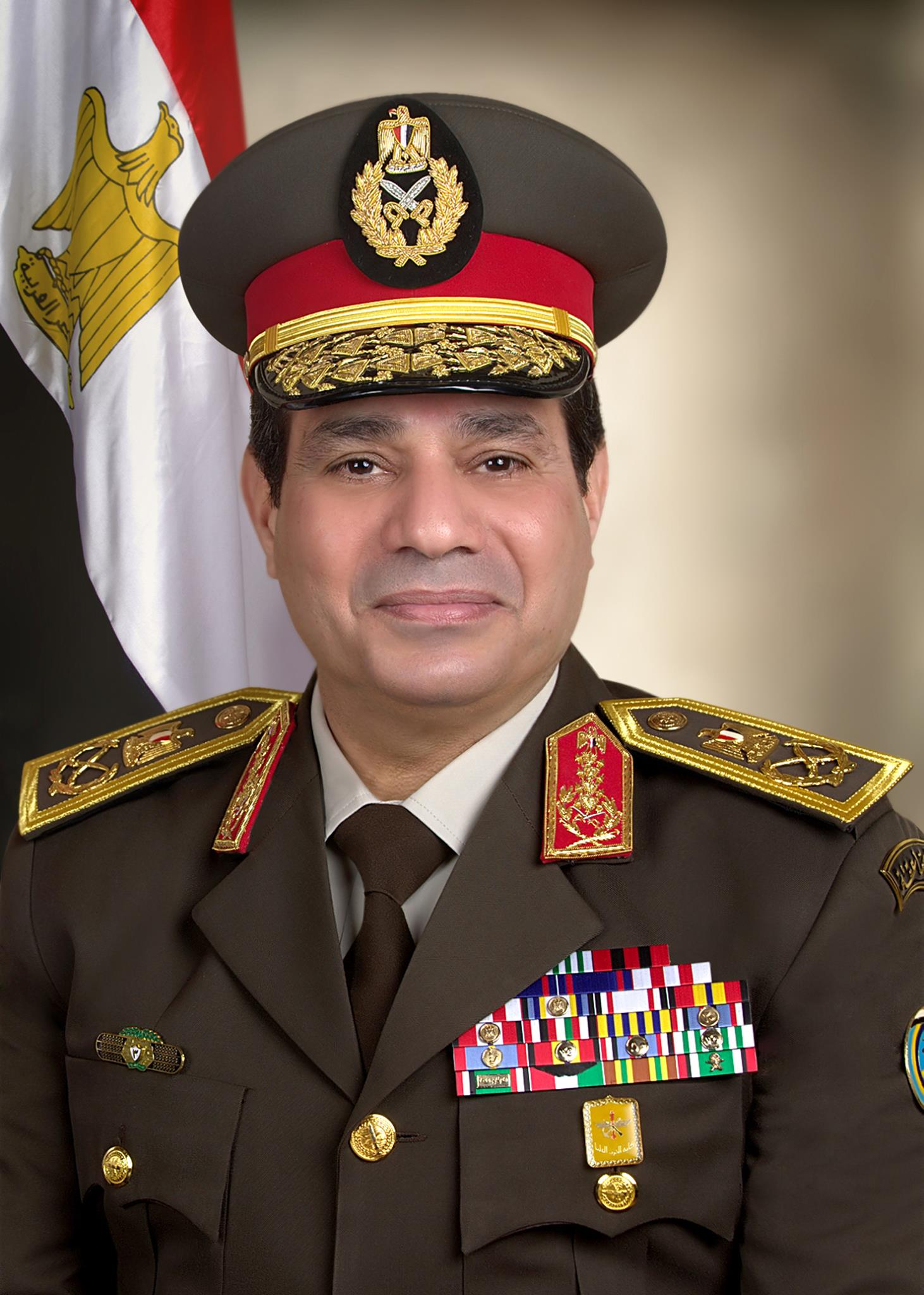
Abdel Fattah el-Sisi

As the deadline of the Armed Forces' ultimatum approached on 3 July, there was renewed expectation of an increase in violence, according to the media. As in other days, there were both anti-Morsi and pro-Morsi protests, the latter particularly in Nasr City and near Cairo University. Army tanks were reported to surround two smaller pro-Morsi rallies as the demonstrators vowed to defend the government with their lives.

As the 16:35 deadline set by the army approached, the coalition met with the military leaders for emergency talks, with the expectation that the army would issue a statement when the deadline passed. Mohamed ElBaradei, who was chosen to represent the National Salvation Front, was also said to have met army chief General Abdel Fattah el-Sisi.

That same day, shortly before the deadline, Morsi offered to form a consensus government. An army statement read: "The General Command of the Armed Forces is currently meeting with a number of religious, national, political and youth icons...There will be a statement issued from the General Command as soon as they are done." At the same time the Freedom and Justice Party's senior leader, Waleed al-Haddad, said: "We do not go to invitations (meetings) with anyone. We have a president and that is it."

At about 17:30, the head of the Republican Guard Mohamed Ahmed Zaki, joined Morsi with some of the Republican Guard officers and conducted the arrest. It was reported from Morsi's assistant Yahya Hamed the flow of conversation took place as Morsi saying "Mohammed (the head of the Republican Guard) you know well you are going to be tried for that." And Mohammed Zaki replying: "I know, however I had already told them I don't want in, because of my special good relations with the president."

==== 3 July military coup ====
On 3 July, General Abdel Fattah el-Sisi, Commander-in-Chief of the Egyptian Armed Forces, announced that there would be new presidential and Shura Council elections. The coalition appointed Chief Justice Adly Mansour as the interim president and charged him with forming a transitional technocratic government. Military vehicles drove throughout Cairo. Morsi was put under house arrest, and was believed to be at the Republican Guard barracks. According to other sources he was taken to a military base and his travel was restricted. Army troops and tanks were reported to have surrounded key facilities and installations. At noon, the Republican Guard, who had Morsi in their care, left his side to allow Army commandos to take him to an undisclosed Ministry of Defence building. He offered no resistance.

General el-Sisi said: "The president's speech last night failed to meet and conform with the demands [of the people, prompting the armed forces to consult] with some of the symbols of the national forces and the youths without excluding anyone. [They agreed on a road map] that includes initial steps that realize the building of a strong and coherent Egyptian society that does not exclude any of its sons and currents and that ends the state of conflict and division." He added the army was standing apart from the political process but was using its vision as the Egyptian people were calling for help and discharged its responsibility. El-Sisi named former Chief Justice Adli Mansour as the interim president and added that he would be sworn in on 4 July. The Shura Council was also dissolved. Morsi condemned his removal as a "full coup" by the general. He also urged everyone to "adhere to peacefulness and avoid shedding blood of fellow countrymen." The Office of Assistant to President of Egypt on Foreign Relations called Morsi's removal a "military coup", and said "there is no democracy without the ballot box".

The announcement of the removal of Morsi was met with cheers in Tahrir Square. Anti-Morsi protesters shouted "Allahu akbar" and "Long live Egypt" and launched fireworks as green laser lights held by those in the crowd lit the sky. Mohamed el-Baradei says the coup was to rectify the issues of the revolution. The Coptic Pope Tawadros II, Grand Imam of al-Azhar Ahmed el-Tayeb, Mohamed ElBaradei and some of the youth leaders of Tamarod, Mahmoud Badr and Mohamed Abdelaziz, spoke in support of the military intervention. The al-Nour party also commented in saying that the events occurred as they were not heard in their call for dialogue. Party Secretary-General Galal Murra commented that: "we took this position (on agreeing to the army political road map) and we took these decisions only so we stop the bloodshed of our people." Pro-Morsi protesters heard a statement from Morsi, which was published on his Facebook page. He called the move a "coup" and rejected the Armed Forces' statement.

The Freedom and Justice Party's Gamal Heshmat said: "There is absolutely no direction towards violence. The Brotherhood are not raised on violence. Their cause is a peaceful one, defending their rights, which is stronger than a "military coup". The army has perpetrated a "shameful coup". We are still in the street, we still don't know if all of the armed forces will accept what Sisi has done." A party spokesman said that what started as a military coup was "turning into something much more." The National Salvation Front, an alliance of multiple political parties, stated on 4 July that "what Egypt is witnessing now is not a military coup by any standards. It was a necessary decision that the Armed Forces' leadership took to protect democracy, maintain the country's unity and integrity, restore stability and get back on track towards achieving the goals of 25 January Revolution."

=== Arrests ===
According to Morsi, he was abducted by the Armed Forces and held at the Republican Guard headquarters one day before the army announced his removal, and held there until 5 July 2013, after which he and his aide were forcibly moved to a naval base for the next four months. His family had stated earlier Morsi was kidnapped on 3 July 2013. The spokesperson of the Egyptian Armed Forces, Colonel Ahmed Ali later denied allegations that Morsi was badly treated, saying they had nothing to hide. The Egyptian Army later gave Catherine Ashton the High Representative of the Union for Foreign Affairs and Security Policy for the European Union permission to meet Morsi. Ashton later stated that Morsi was doing well: "Morsi was keeping up with the latest developments in the country through television and newspapers. So we were able to talk about the situation, and we were able to talk about the need to move forward. The people around him do care for him. I looked at the facilities." Morsi later met an African Union delegation also.

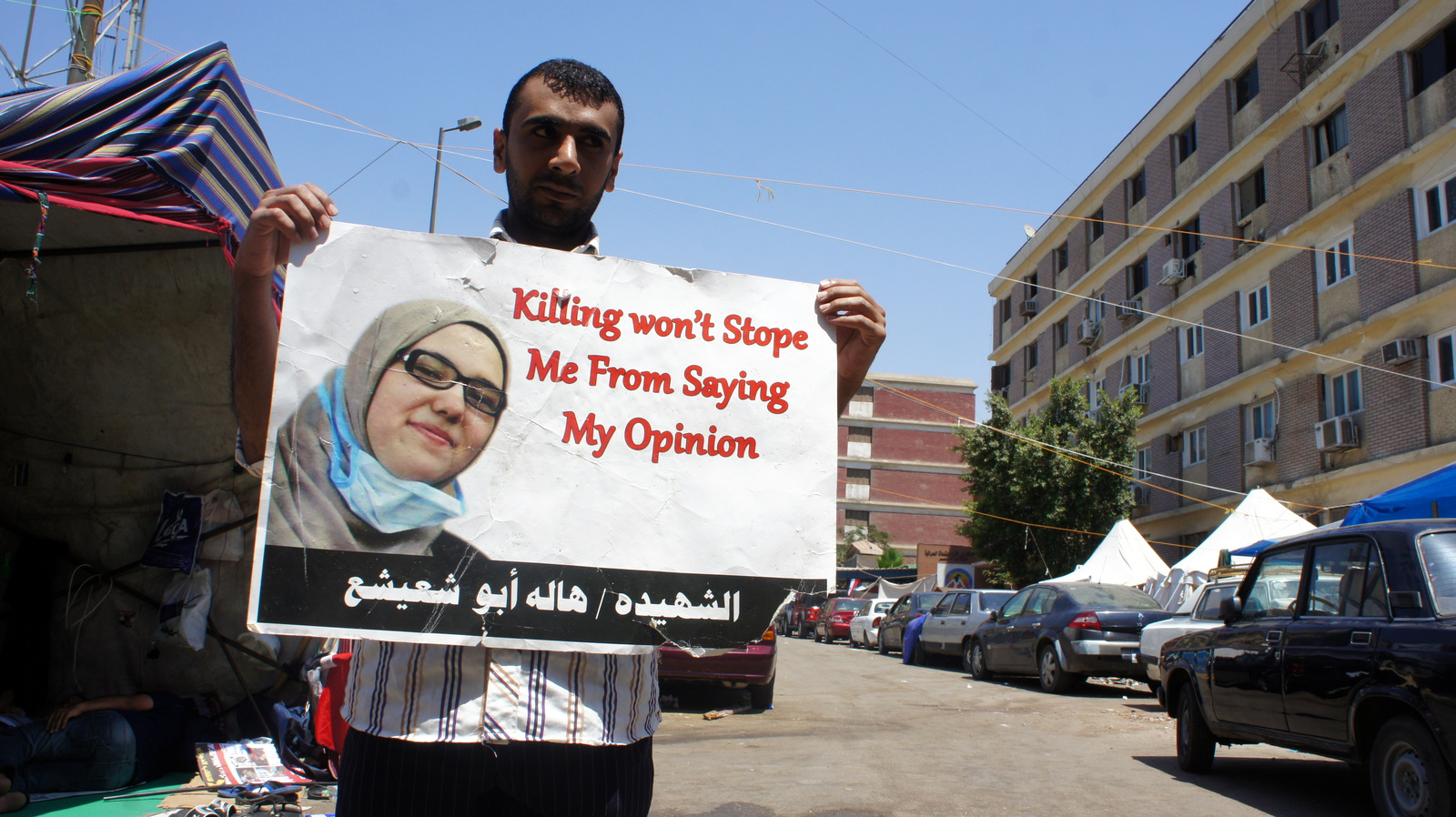
Morsi supporter after mass killings in Cairo, 27 July 2013

The army arrested the former speaker of parliament and the head of Freedom and Justice Party Saad El-Katatni, along with Rashad al-Bayoumi, a Muslim Brotherhood deputy, as well as other top leaders of the Muslim Brotherhood. Al-Jazeera quoted unnamed security officials saying that "more than a dozen" members of the Muslim Brotherhood had been arrested, while Al-Ahram reported that the Egyptian police had been ordered to arrest more than 300 members of the Muslim Brotherhood. A travel ban was also put on Morsi, the head of his Muslim Brotherhood Mohammed Badie, Badie's deputy Khairat El-Shater, the Muslim Brotherhood's former leader Mahdi Akef, another Muslim Brotherhood figure Mohamed Beltagy, Salafi preacher close to the Muslim Brotherhood Safwat Hegazi and the leader of the al-Wasat Party Abou Elela Mady and his deputy Essam Sultan. Badie and Akef were arrested for "incitement to murder."

In December 2013, Morsi as well as high-echelon Muslim Brotherhood leaders were charged with "terrorism and plotting with foreign militants against Egypt" while the Muslim Brotherhood was officially classified as a terrorist group.

By May 2014, approximately 16,000 people, mostly Brotherhood members or supporters, had been imprisoned since the coup.

=== Media restrictions and violence against journalists ===
Police and military forces made statements against four television channels and took them off the air. Misr 25, a channel owned by the Muslim Brotherhood, was shut down and officials said that journalists working for the channel were arrested. The Al-Hafez and Al-Nas TV channels were shut down as well. A few hours later, Al Jazeera's Mubasher Misr, which had been criticized for its alleged pro-Morsi slant, was also taken off the air, its offices raided and its employees detained. Five staff were arrested, including managing director Ayman Gaballah, who was still in custody after the others were released. It was also prevented from broadcasting a pro-Morsi rally in northern Cairo. Associated Press Television News was ordered not to provide Al Jazeera with footage of protests in the country or with any filming equipment, while the Cairo News Company was warned against providing broadcasting equipment. Al Jazeera Media Network's acting Director General Mostafa Souag condemned the move, saying "regardless of political views, the Egyptian people expect media freedoms to be respected and upheld. Media offices should not be subject to raids and intimidation. Journalists should not be detained for doing their jobs."

The Committee to Protect Journalists (CPJ) reported that two journalists and one student were killed while covering Egyptian unrest in the two weeks leading up to 8 July 2013. According to CPJ research, before those deaths only four journalists had been killed in Egypt since 1992. One of the journalists killed while documenting the 2013 clashes was 26-year-old photographer Ahmed Assem el-Senousy, also known as Ahmed Samir Assem. The photographer was shot by a sniper after he recorded security forces firing on protestors. According to media reports, el-Senousy may have captured his own death on film. A video clip posted on his Facebook page shows a sniper firing on crowds before turning toward the camera, at which point the clip abruptly ends.

While reporting for the BBC, journalist Jeremy Bowen was hit in the head with birdshot fired by Egyptian security forces on 5 July.

== Aftermath ==
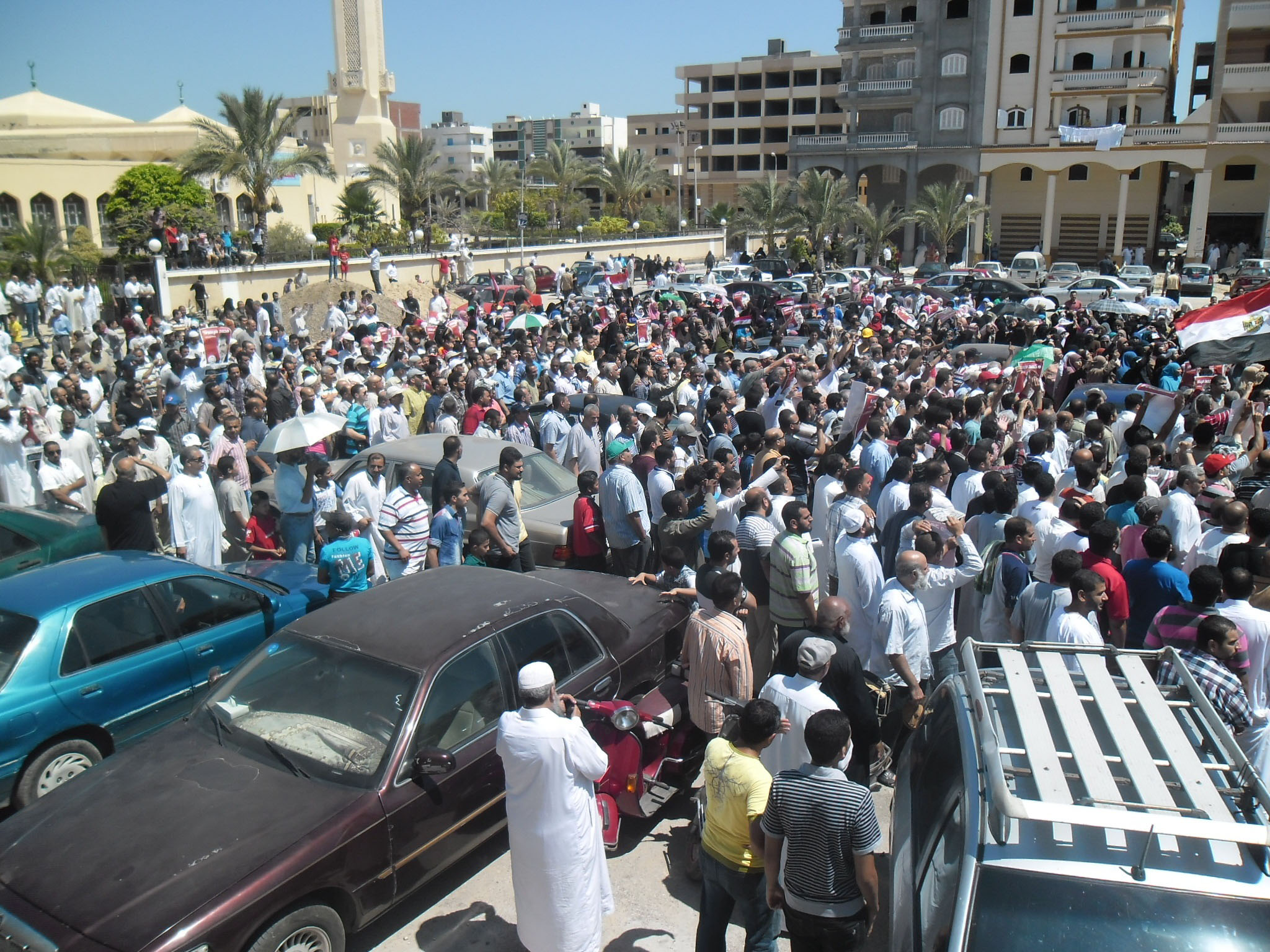
Supporters of the ousted President Morsi demonstrate in Damietta on 5 July 2013.

On 4 July, violence continued with over 100 people wounded and at least two deaths, believed to be that of children. The Muslim Brotherhood's spokesman called for "strictly peaceful" protests to defy the "military coup". Other Islamist groups threatened armed retaliation, while the police arrested four armed men on 5 July over claims that they had planned a reprisal attack, according to state-run Al-Ahram. The Supreme Council of the Armed Forces added that it would protect all groups from revenge attacks and that Egyptian values "do not allow for gloating."

Protests after Friday prayers were called by Morsi supporters, now in opposition, and termed "Rejection Friday." That morning, troops opened fire killing at least 51 pro-Morsi protesters at the Republican Guard headquarters in which Morsi was believed to be held. According to some witnesses, the military opened fire without provocation towards the end of morning prayers, immediately using live ammunition and shooting to kill. At least 51 Morsi supporters were killed and 435 were injured. Though the Egyptian Army denied firing at the protesters, BBC News reporter Jeremy Bowen said he saw soldiers firing on protesters. In Qena, security forces opened fire on protesters trying to storm a security building, injuring two of them. Shots were also fired in Alexandria. This occurred as tens of thousands of Egyptians took to the street to condemn the coup and support Morsi. Despite claiming to respect all sides, the military also issued a statement warning Islamists who planned on protesting. Tamarod, which had organised anti-Morsi protests, called for protests to "protect the revolution." During the night pro and anti-Morsi demonstrators clashed over the 6 October Bridge; at least two people were killed and more than 70 people were injured, according to state television, who quoted medical personnel at a makeshift hospital in the square. At least three deaths were that of Morsi supporters during the march towards the military barracks after the Friday prayer in Cairo. In all, through the night of rioting, throughout the country 30 people were killed. Pro-Morsi demonstrators continued to call for protests. Protesters continued to demand the reinstatement of Morsi throughout the weekend, some of which were violent protests.

Palestinian officials in Gaza also said that the Egyptian Armed Forces had shut the Rafah border crossing and that only certain people, such as patients and students, would be allowed through. Egyptian Intelligence Service official Nader al-Asar telephoned Palestinian Prime Minister in Gaza Ismail Haniyeh on the afternoon of 5 July and Haniyeh briefed him about the humanitarian crisis in Gaza as a result of the restrictions on tunnels and the Rafah crossing. Al-Asar promised to seek remedies on the situation

After dawn prayers on 8 July clashes erupted between pro-Morsi protesters and the army at the Republican Guard compound. According to the army, "terrorists" tried to storm the compound and one officer and 42 other people were injured. On the other hand, the Muslim Brotherhood said that 42 of its supporters were killed and over 300 were injured after shootings that followed the police storming their peaceful sit-in demanding the reinstatement of Morsi. MP Mohamed Beltagy described the incident as a "massacre" during dawn prayers. After the incident, the Freedom and Justice Party, called for "the international community and international groups and all the free people of the world [to] intervene to stop further massacres [...] and prevent a new Syria in the Arab world." The Nour party said it would suspend taking part in the political process as a response to the deadly clashes. And Ahmed el-Hawary, a founding member of the al-Dustour party and a member of 30 June front, said: "We cannot blame the Muslim Brotherhood without blaming the army. They are both held accountable for this catastrophe...The Brotherhood is playing victims to gain international sympathy yet losing whatever is left of the sympathy at home. A speedy formation of the new cabinet is essential at this point, and although consensus is critical. Egypt must not be the hostage of a concurrence based on non-pertinent arguments." At the same time, Morsi supporters were said by the military of having forced two soldiers, Samir Abdallah Ali and Azzam Hazem Ali, to make pro-Morsi statements on a loudspeaker and that one of them was "severely beaten up" and filmed while making the statements. However, an army official later said that they had "managed to escape their captors."

On 8 July, following reports that many fighters in Syria were returning in support of the Muslim Brotherhood, Egypt slapped restrictions on Syrians entering the country and required them to obtain visas before entering the country. An arrest warrant was issued against Mohamed Badie also as the party refused to join a transitional government. The Investigative Reporting Program at the University of California at Berkeley showed that a State Department programme ostensible to support democracy provided funds to activists and politicians for fomenting unrest in Egypt after the ouster of President Hosni Mubarak in February 2011. The Muslim Brotherhood vowed to continue its resistance to the military's ouster of Morsi. In a statement it disavowed itself from an assassination attempt against a senior army commander in the Sinai Peninsula on 10 July and said it adheres to peaceful measures. The statement also read: "We will continue our peaceful resistance to the bloody military coup against constitutional legitimacy. We trust that the peaceful and popular will of the people shall triumph over force and oppression." The public prosecutor issued a freeze on the assets of the Muslim Brotherhood's leaders, as well as other supporters pending investigations in ongoing cases related to events in al-Mokatam, al-Nahda square and the Republican Guards Club. This would affect Mohamed Badie, Khairat al-Shater, Mahmoud Ezzat, Mohammed Mahdi Akef, Saad El-Katatni, Essam el-Erian, Mohamed Elbeltagy and the Muslim Brotherhood's allies, including Essam Sultan, Assem Abdul Majed, Safwat Hegazi and Hazem Salah Abu Ismail, will also be affected by the freeze.

In addition to continuing daily protests, the Muslim Brotherhood called for more protests after Friday prayers on 19 July. The protests were held in Cairo and Alexandria with two formations of fighter jets flying over both cities after noon prayers ended and some military helicopters flew low over roof tops in Cairo. Amongst the tens of thousands of protesters present, they chanted "Islamic, Islamic" calling for an Islamic state. The protests again turned violent and fatal in Cairo and Qalyub on 22 July. Morsi's family also held a press conference in Cairo in which his children accused the military of kidnapping him, as well as announcing local and international legal measures they had initiated against General Abdul Fatah el-Sisi.

In mid-August, the violence against Islamists by the army escalated further, with at least hundreds killed, and the government declaring a month-long nighttime curfew.

Following the mid-August incidents and the imposition of a state of emergency, security forces targeted the Brotherhood and its allies with a wave of arrests of leaders and senior members.

=== 14 August crackdown ===
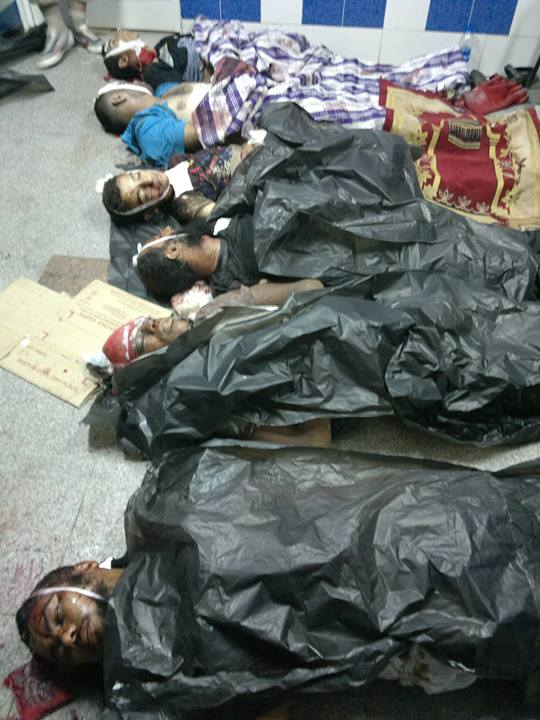
Bodies of pro-Morsi demonstrators

On 14 August 2013, Egyptian security forces raided two camps of protesters in Cairo: one at al-Nahda Square and a larger one at Rabaa al-Adawiya Mosque. The two sites had been occupied by supporters of ousted President Mohamed Morsi, who was removed from office by the military after mass street protests for and against his rule. The camps were raided after initiatives to end the six-week sit-ins failed and as a result of the raids the camps were cleared out within hours.

The Interior Minister Mohamed Ibrahim announced that police used water hoses to disperse the campers. Yet, all videos and photos from the scenes of the raids never showed water or hoses. Tents and bodies were on fire, and the main mosque of Rabaa Al-Adawiya was burned with hundreds of unidentified bodies.

According to Human Rights Watch at least 904 people were killed in what was described as crimes against humanity. However, the Egyptian Health Ministry claimed 638 people were killed and at least 3,994 injured. According to the National Coalition for Supporting Legitimacy (NCSL), the number of deaths from the Rabaa al-Adawiya Mosque sit-in alone were some 2,600. Violent retaliation followed in several cities across the country. The military appointed interim government declared a month-long state of emergency in response and curfews were instituted in many areas. The total casualty count made 14 August the deadliest day since the 2011 Egyptian revolution which toppled former President Hosni Mubarak. The violent dispersals carried out by the security forces were widely denounced by world leaders, with the exception of Gulf Arab states: the U.A.E., Saudi Arabia, and Bahrain.

A study conducted by the Egyptian Centre for Media Studies and Public Opinion revealed that 79% of Egyptians believe the massacres on 14 August were crimes against humanity. 73% hold General El-Sisi, the Defence Minister, responsible for the massacres. Another poll by Egyptian Centre for Public Opinion Research later showed that 67 percent of Egyptians were satisfied about the method in which the Rabaa al-Adaweya and Nahda sit-ins were dispersed.

On 10 December, thirteen Egyptian and international human rights organizations urged Cairo's interim authorities to probe the mass killing of protesters in the capital on 14 August. The joint call issued by organizations that included Amnesty International, Human Rights Watch and Egyptian Initiative for Personal Rights, said an investigation must be launched into the killing of "up to 1,000 people by security forces" almost four months ago when they dispersed sit-ins by supporters of deposed president Mohamed Morsi. "There can be no hope for the rule of law and political stability in Egypt, much less some modicum of justice for victims, without accountability for what may be the single biggest incident of mass killing in Egypt's recent history," said Gasser Abdel-Razak, associate director at the Egyptian Initiative for Personal Rights. "As a first step toward accountability, the government should establish an effective independent fact-finding committee to investigate responsibility throughout the chain of command for the unlawful killings," the rights groups said. They said that on 14 August a "small minority of protesters used firearms... but the police responded excessively by shooting recklessly, going far beyond what is permitted under international law." "After the unprecedented levels of violence and casualties seen since the ousting of Mohamed Morsi, investigations must provide real answers and cannot be another whitewash of the security forces' record," Hassiba Hadj Sahraoui of Amnesty International said in the statement. "Egypt's authorities cannot deal with the carnage through PR in world's capitals, rewriting events and locking up Morsi's supporters." The groups also said the probe should determine whether there is any evidence of a policy to kill protesters or commit other serious crimes.

=== Violence against Coptic Christians ===
Since Morsi's overthrow, Egypt's Christian minority, a reported 6 to 12% of the population, have been the target of sectarian divide tactics by unidentified groups. On 5 July 2013 – two days after Morsi was ousted— mobs rampaged through the Christian village of Nagaa Hassan, burning over seventy churches, as well as burning dozens of homes, ransacking stores and stabbing to death at least four people. This included pro-military Christian activist Emile Naseem, who was hacked and beaten to death. Dozens of Christian families sought protection in a local church.

In Port Said's al-Manakh, masked gunmen opened fire at the Mar Mina Church. Since 30 June, mobs carried out attacks on Christians in six out of Egypt's twenty-seven provinces. Churches across Egypt cancelled their evening Mass and social activities. Other incidents include Coptic Christian priest Mina Abboud Sharobeen being killed in an outdoor market.

Ramy Jan, a Christian journalist and activist, claims that Islamic violence against Copts is rather fabricated and that Muslims would not commit any type of sectarian violence. He considered all previously mentioned incidents as "accusations" to Islamists, to which he reacted by starting the Christians Against the Coup movement in demand of "reestablishing democracy", joining with his movement the Anti-Coup Alliance. However, Jan's credibility and that of the group he supposedly represented was severely challenged when it was revealed that he was also in fact a member of the Egyptian Nazi Party.

In 2011, Egypt opened a probe on former Interior Minister Habib el-Adly's reported role in the New Year's Eve bombing of al-Qiddissin Church in Alexandria in which twenty-four people were killed. According to the UK diplomatic sources quoted in the reports, the former interior ministry had masterminded the deadly church attack with the intent to blame it on Islamists, escalate government crackdown on them, and gain increased western support for the regime. The former interior minister had built up in over six years a special security system that was managed by twenty-two officers and that employed a number of former radical Islamists, drug dealers and some security firms to carry out acts of sabotage around the country in case the regime was under threat to collapse. The proclamation also pointed, sourcing reports on UK intelligence services, that interior ministry officer Maj. Fathi Abdelwahid began on 11 December 2011, preparing Ahmed Mohamed Khaled, who had spent eleven years in Egyptian prisons, to contact an extremist group named Jundullah and coordinate with it the attack on the Alexandria church. Khaled reportedly told the group he could assist with providing weapons he had allegedly obtained from Gaza and that the act was meant to "discipline the Copts."

=== Other incidents ===
The day after the coup, militant gunmen staged multiple attacks on security forces in the Sinai and Suez. One soldier was killed and two others were wounded at a police station near the local headquarters of military intelligence in Rafah as it was attacked by rocket fire. Attackers also fired rocket-propelled grenades at army checkpoints guarding El Arish airport. A protest by hundreds of people occurred in Al-Arish the day after the ouster with calls to form a war council to combat the army. Ten areas in north Sinai were witness to clashes, including the Central Security Force camp and a number of checkpoints along the ring road. The airport was also closed after being targeted by unidentified armed men.

In late July 2013 the Egyptian military reportedly launched "Operation Sinai" in an effort to quash the militants.

On 5 December, a court in Egypt sentenced Mohammed Badie, the leader of the Muslim Brotherhood, to life imprisonment for his part in the violence in 2013.

=== 2014 referendum ===
According to the official results 38.6% of eligible voters participated in a referendum held on 14–15 January 2014 on a new constitution; 98.1% of those who voted supported the new constitution.

=== Propaganda ===
In April 2021, an Egyptian series called 'The Choice' received condemnation on social media platforms for depicting the controversial Rab’a massacre by apparently adopting the state's narrative. The depiction has also been disputed by human rights organizations for the glorification of the Egyptian army and security forces. On the contrary, rights organizations like Human Rights Watch claim that the security forces crushed demonstrators at the peaceful sit-ins in Rab’a and Al-Nahda squares, killing approximately 800 people in the 2013 massacre. According to media reports, 'The Choice' has been produced by an Egyptian production house called Synergy, which allegedly has links to the Egyptian regime and thus, is in line with the regime's propaganda. The team behind the series claims to have used archival footage of the event issued by news media like Al-Jazeera and the Egyptian Center for Human Rights, along with witness testimonies. However, a careful selection of short clips and pictures was done, not masking, but manipulating the reality concerning the Egyptian security personnel and their role in the massacre, portrayed as a terror event in the series.

== Reactions ==
=== Domestic ===
Amid months of protests, and after his trial had started, Morsi said on 13 November that he was kidnapped by the military the day before his removal and that the move was treason.

A poll by the Egyptian Centre for Public Opinion Research (Baseera) showed 17% of Egyptians believed that the sit-ins were peaceful, while 67% believed they were not. Another poll by Baseera showed 69% of Egyptians do not approve of the Muslim Brotherhood's continuation (in politics) and 57% of Egyptians feel the Muslim Brotherhood is responsible for all instances of violence since the sit-in dispersals.

=== International ===
==== Supranational bodies ====
- African Union – A statement from the group read that its head, Nkosazana Dlamini-Zuma, "observes that the removal of...Mursi [sic] was in violation of the provisions of the Egyptian Constitution and falls under the AU doctrine on unconstitutional changes of Government. [The Peace and Security Council (PSC)] will deliberate on the situation in Egypt and take the required decisions." It added of Dlamini-Zuma that "she is particularly concerned about the tension prevailing in the country and the risks that this situation poses to stability and security in Egypt as well as to the consolidation of its democratic process. [The AU's] principled position on unconstitutional changes of government" underscores the need "to find an appropriate response to the popular aspirations within the framework of legality and Egyptian institutions." Following debate on 5 July, the PSC made a decision to suspend Egypt over the coup and added that it was sending a team of "high-level personalities" in order work toward restoring constitutional order.
- European Union – High Representative of the Union for Foreign Affairs and Security Policy Catherine Ashton said: "I urge all sides to rapidly return to the democratic process, including the holding of free and fair presidential and parliamentary elections and the approval of a constitution, to be done in a fully inclusive manner, so as to permit the country to resume and complete its democratic transition. I hope that the new administration will be fully inclusive and reiterate the importance of ensuring full respect for fundamental rights, freedoms, and the rule of law and will hold the authorities to account for this. I strongly condemn all violent acts, offer my condolences to the families of the victims, and urge the security forces to do everything in their power to protect the lives and well-being of Egyptian citizens. I call on all sides to exercise maximum restraint." During a visit to Cairo, Ashton met the interim president, Adly Mansour, but she also said that she regretted being unable to meet Morsi. She said: "I believe he should be released. I was assured he is well. I would have liked to see him."
- United Nations – Secretary-General Ban Ki-moon said: "At this moment of continued high tension and uncertainty in the country, the secretary-general reiterates his appeals for calm, non-violence, dialogue and restraint. An inclusive approach is essential to addressing the needs and concerns of all Egyptians. Preservation of fundamental rights, including freedom of speech and assembly remain of vital importance. In their protests many Egyptians have voiced deep frustrations and legitimate concerns. At the same time, military interference in the affairs of any state is of concern. Therefore, it will be crucial to quickly reinforce civilian rule in accordance with principles of democracy." He also called for "speedy resumption of civilian rule." He spoke to Egyptian Foreign Minister Nabil Fahmy and "called for an end to all violence, especially sexual violence against women." High Commissioner for Human Rights Navi Pillay urged all parties to make a concerted effort to restore calm by ensuring that the human rights of all citizens are respected and protected and are subsequently entrenched in sound laws and institutions. She also urged Egypt to stop arbitrary detentions.

==== States ====
- Argentina – The Foreign Ministry issued a statement that read that "the Argentine government follows with concern the recent events in Egypt that led to the interruption of the democratic process, the destitution of its legitimate authorities, and a complex political and social situation."
- Australia – Prime Minister Kevin Rudd called for a swift return to democracy in Egypt and upgraded the national travel warning for Egypt to its second highest level.
- Bahrain – King Hamad bin Isa Al-Khalifa wrote to his Egyptian counterpart, Adly Mansour, "With great honor we take this opportunity to congratulate you on taking over the reins of power in Egypt at this important time in history. We are confident that you will take the responsibility to achieve the aspirations of the Egyptian people."
- Canada – Foreign Minister John Baird called for "a transparent democratic system that respects the voices of its citizens." A spokesperson for the foreign ministry called the removal of president Morsi a "coup".
- China – Foreign Ministry spokeswoman Hua Chunying said: "China respects the choice of the Egyptian people. We also hope that all parties concerned in Egypt can avoid using violence and properly solve their disputes through dialogue and consultation and realise reconciliation and social stability."
- Colombia – The Foreign Ministry issued a press release stating that "the National Government is following with major attention the current events that have been taking place in the Arab Republic of Egypt and expresses its confidence in the corresponding political characters and the Egyptian society to deploy their best efforts to promptly hold elections, re-establish democracy and the constitutional order in that country. [Colombia] calls on their friends, the Egyptian people, to exercise their rights in a peaceful manner and that the authorities in charge of the political transition to avoid any violent situation that might hamper the reconciliation and the aspirations of the Egyptian people to establish a solid and prosperous democracy in the country. The National Government will be kept informed on the evolution of the situation through its ambassador in the Arab Republic of Egypt."
- France – President Francois Hollande talked of Tunisia as an Arab Spring model on the first visit there by a French leader since the Tunisian revolution where he said that Islam and democracy were "on the same path." He compared this to other Arab Spring countries in saying: "You (Tunisia) are heading in the right direction. In Libya the transition has been tainted by violence; in Egypt the transition was stopped after the removal of the elected president; and in Syria, desire for change led to war." Foreign Minister Laurent Fabius said: "In a situation that has worsened seriously and with extreme tension in Egypt, new elections have finally been announced, after a transition period. [A timetable should be drawn up respecting] civil peace, pluralism, individual liberties and the achievements of the democratic transition, so that the Egyptian people can freely choose their leaders and their future."
- Germany – Foreign Minister Guido Westerwelle said: "This is a major setback for democracy in Egypt. It is urgent that Egypt return as quickly as possible to the constitutional order. There is a real danger that the democratic transition in Egypt will be seriously damaged."
- Iran – Foreign Minister Ali Akbar Salehi asked the military government to hold a new election soon. In a statement published by the Foreign Ministry: "Iran will respect to the Egyptian political requirements and it is hoped that future political developments will happen in the interests of the people." Foreign Ministry spokesman Abbas Araqchi said that Iran was concerned about the "continuance of clashes between the opposition and Morsy supporters. Unfortunately, the unrest during last few days left several dead and injured, but Egyptians should be united and stop the violence." He later said: "We do not consider proper the intervention by military forces in politics to replace a democratically elected administration. Islamists and revolutionaries should not be frustrated. We do not see the recent events in Egypt as a defeat for Islamic awakening."
- Iraq – Prime Minister Nouri al-Maliki's spokesman, Ali al-Moussawi, said that he expressed support for the Egyptian people's choices, while also congratulating the interim president, Adly Mansour. al-Moussawi said that Iraq is "looking forward to boosting bilateral relations" and is "certain that the new president will move on with the new plan in holding elections and safeguarding national reconciliation."
- Israel – Prime Minister Benjamin Netanyahu ordered his cabinet ministers "not to release public statements or grant interviews," according to Haaretz. Yet Transportation Minister Yisrael Katz told Israeli Army Radio: "It is an Egyptian matter; we must worry about our own interests, and I am sure we are doing just that."
  - Former Ambassador to Egypt Eli Shaked said: "Instability is bad for Israel, period."
- Jordan – A government statement read that it respected the wishes of the Egyptian people as well as the role of the armed forces.
- Kuwait – Kuwait News Agency reported: "In his name and the country's name, His Highness expressed his congratulations to the president of the Republic of Egypt, for taking the lead during the transitional and historical stage." The country then also gave US$4 billion in aid following Morsi's removal.
- Lebanon – Prime Minister-designate Tammam Salam cabled Adly Mansour to congratulate him on his appointment as interim leader.
- Libya – Speaking from Rome, Prime Minister Ali Zidan said: "We support any political choice by the Egyptian people and we are with it. We support the Egyptian people and we wish to it peace and stability as its stability and security are also Libya's. Our relationship with Egypt will not be affected by any change. It is strategic and it will always be strong based on mutual respect, neighborhood and brotherhood. Libya does not intervene in the internal affairs of other countries."
- Malaysia – Prime Minister Najib Razak said "Malaysians should learn from the conflict in Egypt when the changes you want to claim is not a guarantee of prosperity and well-being of the people." Nevertheless, Minister of Youth and Sports Khairy Jamaluddin stated "UMNO Youth Malaysia condemned the coup and the arrest of Dr. Morsi. Incident erupted after prolonged demonstration were not only killed, but also bring the riots and violent clashes between supporters and opponents of the government there."
  - Pan-Malaysian Islamic Party's Murshidul Am Tuan Guru Nik Abdul Aziz Nik Mat described it as another "dark moment" repeating in Egypt.
  - Meanwhile, PKR de facto leader Anwar Ibrahim said any military coup must be condemned by democratic countries. "A leader democratically elected through free and fair elections should not be deposed in such a manner. [The coup is a] major setback for the Arab Spring. Whatever the ends, the means are not justified."
- Norway – Foreign Minister Espen Barth Eide said Norway regretted that the political process has not led to a unifying solution for Egypt and instead the army intervened to oust President Morsi. "Norway has always encouraged Morsi and the opposition to find solutions to the country's challenges through a broad and inclusive process" and added that Norway provides full support for democratic development in Egypt and moreover it was essential to allow for a civilian government with a democratic election quickly.
- Netherlands – Spokesman for Consular Affairs Toon van Wijk said that "we are following the situation in Egypt closely. But there's no reason for us to make reductions to our embassy staff in Cairo or to ask personnel to come home."
- Pakistan – Prime Minister Nawaz Sharif called for the immediate release of Morsi. A statement issued by the Foreign Office read: "Pakistan therefore urges all sides in Egypt to address the legal and constitutional issues in an inclusive and peaceful manner to enable the country to successfully restore the democratic institutions as early as possible. We also call for the immediate release of President Muhamed Morsi."
- Palestinian Authority– The Fatah-President Mahmoud Abbas called on Palestinians "not to interfere in internal issues of Arab countries," which was read by the media as supportive of the ouster. PLO executive committee member Hanan Ashrawi said: "I don't see this as a coup d'état. We see this as recognising the will of the people there for the armed forces serving and protecting the people as they should."
- Philippines – President Benigno Aquino III's spokesman, Edwin Lacierda, advised Filipinos to avoid areas of conflict. Lacierda also assured that the personnel of the Philippine embassy in Cairo will not be pulled out and that the number one concern of the Department of Foreign Affairs, is to ensure the safety of Filipino nationals in Egypt. However, Lacierda refused to comment if the Philippine government supported the ousting of Morsi.
- Poland – Ministry of Foreign Affairs spokesman, Marcin Bosacki, said: "It is with concern that we received news of the suspension of Egypt's constitution and the removal of President Mohamed Morsy from power. Such a solution must be treated as at least a temporary freeze of the democratic process initiated by the Egyptian nation over two years ago. What is most important today is that the current Egyptian authorities – staying true to their promises – undertake the fastest possible steps to return full power to democratically elected representatives of society."
- Qatar – Qatar was reported to be unhappy over the move after it spent about US$10 billion in financial aid towards the Morsi government; while they were said to also be unhappy about the closure of Al Jazeera's offices in Cairo. Yet the new emir, Tamim bin Hamad Al Thani, sent "a cable of congratulations" to the new interim president. The Foreign Ministry released a statement that read: "Qatar will continue to respect the will of Egypt and its people across the spectrum." After a month of protests and international mediation efforts, Foreign Minister Khalid Al Attiyah said that he had not been able to meet all those he was promised he could meet and that "my wish for the brothers in Egypt is to release the political prisoners as soon as possible because they are the key to unlocking this crisis. Without a serious dialogue with all the parties, and most importantly with the political prisoners because they are the main element in this crisis, I believe things will be difficult." Qatar also continued to send free shipments of oil that were promised under Morsi.
- Russia – The Foreign Ministry issued a statement that read: "We consider it important for all political forces in Egypt to exercise restraint...to consider the broad national interests of their actions, and to prove that they strive to solve the brewing political and socio-economic problems in a democratic framework, without violence, and accounting for the interests of all social groups and religious confessions."
- Saudi Arabia – King Abdullah was the first international head of state to send a message of congratulations to Interim President Adly Mansour. "In my own name and on behalf of the people of the Kingdom of Saudi Arabia, I congratulate you on assuming the leadership of Egypt at this critical point of its history. By doing so, I appeal to Allah Almighty to help you to shoulder the responsibility laid on your shoulder to achieve the hopes of our sisterly people of the Arab Republic of Egypt. At the same time, we strongly shake hands with the men of all the armed forces, represented by General Abdel Fattah el-Sisi, who managed to save Egypt at this critical moment from a dark tunnel God only could apprehend its dimensions and repercussions, but the wisdom and moderation came out of those men to preserve the rights of all parties in the political process. Please accept our greetings to you and deep respect to our brothers in Egypt and its people, wishing Egypt steady stability and security."
- Sudan – Foreign Minister Ali Karti called his former Egyptian counterpart, Mohamed Kamel Amr, to ask about the situation in Egypt. He also expressed hope that Egypt will enjoy security, stability and social peace, while saying Sudan respected the people's will and that the event was an internal matter. Further, he underscored the unique nature of the relationship between their two countries. The government also said that the ouster was a "domestic affair" and that "Sudan calls on all parties in Egypt to make as a priority to preserve Egypt's stability and security, peace and unity of its people," while saying that it wanted "brotherly ties" with Egypt.
  - Islamist opposition leader, Hassan al-Turabi said: "This is a coup against the constitution, against the legitimacy. He (Morsi) was the first democratically elected leader. He issued a constitution which the people wanted."
- Sweden – Foreign Minister Carl Bildt wrote on Twitter: "I'm horrified by the large number of dead in the demonstrations in Egypt. Security forces can't avoid responsibility." The tweet came after at least 80 protesters were confirmed dead and 411 were injured after security forces had opened fire on pro-Morsi demonstrators on a road near the Rabia Al-Adawiya Mosque.
- Switzerland – The Federal Department of Foreign Affairs issued a statement that read: "Switzerland expects to see a swift return to democracy in which all the social forces in the country are involved and in which fundamental human rights are respected. It expresses the hope that a peaceful solution can be found to the current political polarization in Egypt and it calls on all sides to renounce the use of violence."
- Ba'athist Syria – President Bashar al-Assad told the newspaper Thawra that "whoever brings religion to use in politics or in favour of one group at the expense of another will fall anywhere in the world. The summary of what is happening in Egypt is the fall of what is called political Islam. You can't fool all the people all the time, let alone the Egyptian people who have a civilisation that is thousands of years old, and who espouse clear, Arab nationalist thought. After a whole year, reality has become clear to the Egyptian people. The Muslim Brotherhood's performance has helped them see the lies the [movement] used at the start of the popular revolution in Egypt."
- Tunisia – The government of the founding state of the Arab Spring, condemned the "flagrant coup," with Ennahda party leader Rachid Ghannouchi expressing his astonishment and said that the removal of Morsi would undermine democracy and feed radicalism.
- Turkey – Turkey has signaled to the coup negatively and used statements, diplomatic channels and financial measures. Prime Minister Recep Tayyip Erdogan said: "No matter where they are...coups are bad. Coups are clearly enemies of democracy. Those who rely on the guns in their hands, those who rely on the power of the media cannot build democracy...Democracy can only be built at ballot box." He also criticised the West for not terming the actions as a coup, while praising the African Union's decision to suspend Egypt over the coup. "The West has failed the sincerity test. No offence, but democracy does not accept double standards." Foreign Minister Ahmet Davutoglu said in a televised statement that "The toppling of a government that came into office through democratic elections, through methods that are not legal – and what is worse, through a military coup – is unacceptable, no matter what the reasons". Hüseyin Çelik, a spokesman for the governing Justice and Development Party and former cabinet member in the Erdoğan administration, condemned the ouster as a sign of "backwardness" and accused unnamed Western countries of supporting Morsi's overthrow. "Some Western countries have not accepted Muslim Brotherhood's rise to power. They have mobilized the streets, then issued a memorandum, and are now staging the coup." He also advised Morsi's supporters to avoid bloodshed in response. Erdoğan would himself confront a coup in 2016, but withstand being deposed.
  - The leader of the opposition Republican People's Party, Kemal Kılıçdaroğlu, also criticised Egypt's military over the ouster, "Staging a military coup to design societies is not a correct thing in the 21st century and it shouldn't be accepted."
- United Arab Emirates – Foreign Minister Abdullah bin Zayed Al Nahyan said that his government was satisfied with the developments in Egypt. Al Nahyan also praised the Egyptian army as a "strong shield" and a "protector," while expressing confidence that Egypt can overcome the crisis "to reach a safe and prosperous future."
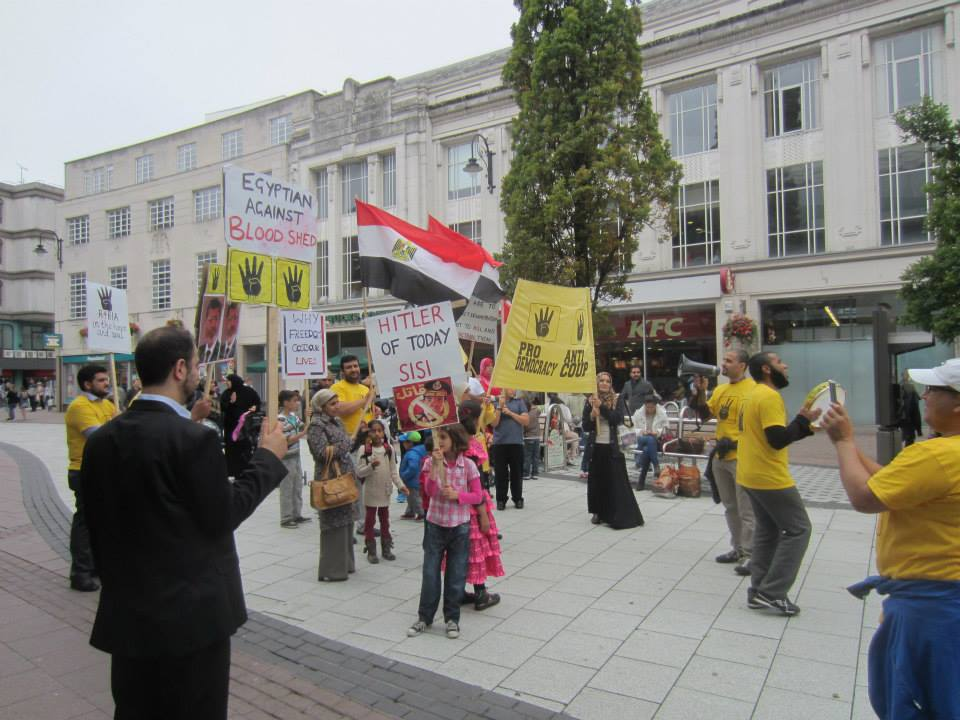
- Egyptian protesters carry Anti-Coup signs in Cardiff, UK on 21 September 2013.
  United Kingdom – Prime Minister David Cameron said that the United Kingdom "never supports intervention by the military. But what now needs to happen...in Egypt is for democracy to flourish and for a genuine democratic transition to take place and all the parties need to be involved in that. And that's what Britain and our allies will be saying very clearly to the Egyptians." Foreign Secretary William Hague said the United Kingdom "does not support military intervention as a way to resolve disputes in a democratic system." He also called the situation "dangerous" and called on all sides to "avoid violence" and resort to "a political process that includes all groups on an equal footing leading to early and fair elections which all parties are able to contest, and civilian-led government."
- United States –
  - President Barack Obama said he was "deeply concerned" by the actions of Egypt's military and urged a return to democratic governance. He ordered his administration to review United States aid to Egypt. He added: "No transition to democracy comes without difficulty, but in the end it must stay true to the will of the people. An honest, capable and representative government is what ordinary Egyptians seek and what they deserve. The long-standing partnership between the United States and Egypt is based on shared interests and values, and we will continue to work with the Egyptian people to ensure that Egypt's transition to democracy succeeds."
  - The State Department also expressed concern over the military intervention and ordered the mandatory evacuation of its embassy in Cairo, while it issued a travel advisory that "the Department of State ordered the departure of non-emergency US government personnel and family members from Egypt due to the ongoing political and social unrest." On 5 July, State Department Spokeswoman Jennifer Psaki said: "We call on all Egyptian leaders to condemn the use of force and to prevent further violence among their supporters. As President Obama said, we expect the military to ensure that the rights of all Egyptians are protected, including the right to peaceful assembly, and we call on all who are protesting to do so peacefully."
  - Deputy Secretary of State William J. Burns said on 15 July: "Only Egyptians can determine their future. I did not come with American solutions, nor did I come to lecture anyone. We know that Egyptians must forge their own path to democracy. We know that this will not mirror our own and we will not try to impose our model on Egypt. [The U.S. would] stand behind certain basic principles, not any particular personalities or parties." He also criticised the exclusion of Islamist parties from the political process: "If representatives of some of the largest parties in Egypt are detained or excluded, how are dialogue and participation possible?"
  - On 26 July, the United States said that it would not make a formal determination of whether the events in Egypt constituted a coup. State Department spokeswoman Jen Psaki said: "The law does not require us to make a formal determination ... as to whether a coup took place, and it is not in our national interest to make such a determination."
  - Republican Senator John McCain, who is a member of the Senate Foreign Relations Committee, said: "We have to suspend aid to Egyptian military because the military has overturned the vote of the people. We cannot repeat the same mistakes that we made in other times of our history by supporting removal of freely elected governments." He added that once a timetable was arranged for a new election and a new constitution "we should evaluate whether to continue with aid or not." He was the first U.S. politician to refer to the events as a coup.
  - Representatives Ed Royce, the chairman of the House Foreign Affairs Committee, and Eliot Engel, members of different parties released a statement that declared:
    The decision by the Egyptian military to take state authority out of the hands of the ruling Muslim Brotherhood government marks another sharp turning point in Egypt's incomplete revolution. What the Brotherhood neglected to understand is that democracy means more than simply holding elections. Real democracy requires inclusiveness, compromise, respect for human and minority rights, and a commitment to the rule of law. Morsi and his inner circle did not embrace any of these principles and instead chose to consolidate power and rule by fiat. As a result, the Egyptian people and their economy suffered greatly. It is now up to the Egyptian military to demonstrate that the new transitional government can and will govern in a transparent manner and work to return the country to democratic rule. We are encouraged that a broad cross-section of Egyptians will gather to rewrite the constitution. All parties in Egypt must show restraint, prevent violence, and prepare to be productive players in the future democratic Egypt. We encourage the military to exercise extreme caution moving forward and support sound democratic institutions through which the people and future governments can flourish
  - Ambassador to Israel Dan Shapiro said from Tel Aviv that the U.S. supports any democratic regime in Egypt and such a commitment towards democracy is what pushed Obama to call for a swift peaceful transition of power.
  - United States Secretary of State John Kerry said that Egypt's army had "restored democracy" by removing Morsi from power.

The military was asked to intervene by millions and millions of people, all of whom were afraid of a descendance into chaos, into violence And the military did not take over, to the best of our judgement – so far. To run the country, there's a civilian government. In effect, they were restoring democracy.

- Yemen – President Abd Rabbuh Mansur Hadi congratulated his Egyptian counterpart, Adly Mansour, raising the ire of his Islamist coalition partners.
  - Hamid al-Ahmar, a leading member of the Yemeni Congregation for Reform, that supported Morsi since the movement was formed by members of the Yemeni Muslim Brotherhood, said: "What happened in Egypt was an overturn of democracy. With sincere hearts, we should ask God to help Morsi."

==== Media ====
Syrian state-television carried live coverage of the anti-Morsi protests. It also said of the statement that "Syria's people and leadership and army express their deep appreciation for the national, populist movement in Egypt which has yielded a great achievement."

The United States media pointed out that Obama did not call the removal of Morsi a coup. If Obama accepts that a coup had taken place, then U.S. law requires him to cut off military and economic aid to Egypt such as previous incidents in Mauritania, Mali, Madagascar and Pakistan. The U.S. funds 20% of Egypt's military costs (US$1.3 billion) and gives another US$250 million in economic aid. Al Jazeera noted that the refusal to term the events as a coup were tied with the U.S. stance in stopping military aid to countries that have perpetrated a coup.

The media noted that the U.K. did not condemn the removal of Morsi, nor call for him to be restored to power. Some media reports refer to the events as another "revolution" and there has been debate as to whether events are best named as being a coup or not.

==== Others ====
- Al-Qaeda – Al-Qaeda's Egyptian leader Ayman al-Zawahiri commented in a video released on the Internet by criticising the Islamists for losing power and not uniting to implement Sharia. He said: "The battle isn't over, it has just started...the Islamic nation should offer victims and sacrifices to achieve what it wants and restore power from the corrupt authority governing Egypt."
- (Islamic Wilayaat of Somalia) al-Shabaab announced on Twitter: "It's time to remove those rose-tinted spectacles and see the world as accurately as it is, change comes by the bullet alone; NOT the ballot. [The Muslim Brotherhood] should perhaps learn a little from the lessons of history and those 'democratically elected' before them in Algeria or even Hamas. When will the Muslim Brotherhood (MB) wake up from their deep slumber and realize the futility of their efforts at instituting change. After a year of stumbling on the hurdles, the MB horse is finally off to the knacker's yard, never to see the light of day again."
- Hamas Member of Parliament in Gaza, Yahia Moussa said: "The [Hamas] movement does not interfere in Egyptian affairs [and has] no comment on the Egyptian army's decision to isolate President Morsi." A senior Hamas figure Ahmad Yousef, said: "We do not fear the fall of President Mohamed Morsy. [sic] We fear the dramatic changes that could cause things to go out of hand and lead to bloodshed. We only care about stability in Egypt regardless of who is in charge. Egypt is a lifeline to us; it's a major factor in the stability of the internal Palestinian situation – it is our backbone."
- PFLP member of the central committee in Gaza, Jamil Mezher, said that the leftist group supports the Egyptian people's choice and their chief demands for freedom and social justice. He also refused to call the military's action a "coup" and added: "Legitimacy doesn't lie only in the ballot box. Legitimacy lies in the people's calls and their aspirations; it is the millions who filled Egypt's streets and squares demanding change and calling for freedom and political inclusion."

Egyptian Americans, particularly in the Arab-dominated areas of Michigan, had mixed views of the event with some wary of the Muslim Brotherhood, but also wary of usurping democratic rights following a 30-year dictatorship.

Amnesty International called on foreign governments to stop supplying further arms to the country.

== See also ==
- August 2013 Rabaa massacre
- Egyptian Revolution of 2011
- Egyptian Revolution of 1952
- Egyptian Revolution of 1919
- Nassef Sawiris
