= History of the Muslim Brotherhood in Egypt (1928–1938) =

The History of the Muslim Brotherhood in Egypt (1928–1938) discusses the that brotherhood from its inception to its development into a viable political force.

== Early development ==
In 1928, six Egyptian workers employed by British military camps in Isma'iliyya, in the Suez Canal Zone in Egypt, visited Hassan al-Banna, a young schoolteacher whom they had heard preach in mosques and coffee-houses on the need for an Islamic renewal. "Arabs and Muslims have no status and no dignity," they said. "They are no more than mere hirelings belonging to the foreigners.... We are unable to perceive the road to action as you perceive it...." They therefore asked him to become their leader; he accepted, founding the Society of the Muslim Brothers.

Banna and his followers began by starting an evening school. In its first few years, the Society was focused on Islamic education, with an emphasis on teaching students how to implement an ethos of solidarity and altruism in their daily lives, rather than on theoretical issues. The General Inspector of Education was greatly impressed, particularly by the eloquent speeches of the working-class members of the Brotherhood. Banna's deputy was a carpenter, and the appointment of people from the lower classes to leading positions became a hallmark of the Brotherhood.

The Society's first major project was the construction of a mosque, completed in 1931, for which it managed to raise a large amount of money while carefully maintaining its independence from potentially self-interested donors. In the same year, the Society began to receive favourable attention in the press, and a Cairo branch was founded.

In 1932, Banna was transferred to Cairo at his request, and the organisation's headquarters were moved there. In addition to handling the administration of the Society, Banna gave evening lectures on the Qur'an for "the poor of the district around the headquarters who were 'without learning and without the will for it'".

Over the next decade, the Society grew very rapidly. From three branches in 1931, it grew to have 300 across Egypt in 1938; thanks to an unorthodox ideology with mass appeal, and to effective strategies for attracting new members, it had become a major political opposition group with a highly diverse membership.

== Ideological innovations ==
The Brotherhood initially resembled an ordinary Islamic welfare society. In the early 1930s, its welfare activities included small-scale social work among the poor, building and repairing mosques and establishing a number of Qur'an schools (whose role in teaching children to read and write was important in a country where 80% of the population was illiterate), setting up small workshops and factories, and organising the collection and distribution of zakat (the Islamic alms tax). As the Society grew, it increasingly founded benevolent institutions such as pharmacies, hospitals and clinics for the general public, and launched a program to teach adults to read and write by offering courses in coffee-shops and clubs.

However, Banna's vision of a new sort of organisation, capable of renewing broken links between tradition and modernity, enabled the Brotherhood to gain a degree of popularity and influence that no welfare society enjoyed. He observed that, in the midst of a flourishing Egyptian civil society and a cultural environment marked by innovations in literature, science and education, religious education had been left behind: the ideas of Islamic religious reformers were not made accessible to the general public, and there was no serious effort to make the history and teachings of Islam comprehensible to the young. He was determined to fill this gap by training a cadre of young, highly motivated preachers equipped with modern teaching methods, independent from the government and the religious establishment, and supported by an effective use of the new mass media.

The Brotherhood's second General Conference, in 1933, authorised the creation of a publishing company and the purchase of a printing press, which was used to print several newspapers during the next decade. Funds were raised by creating a joint stock company in which only members were allowed to buy shares. This approach, which protected the Society's independence from government and from the wealthy by ensuring that its institutions were owned by its members, became its standard means of financing new projects.

During the 1930s, Banna formulated, and the Society began to put into practice, an Islamic ideology that was unusual in several respects. It was, first of all, an ideology of disenfranchised classes. In a country where most political movements, including liberal and modernist ones, were products of the landed aristocracy and the urban elite, the Brotherhood became the voice of the educated middle and lower middle classes (and to a lesser extent of workers and peasants) and the means by which they demanded political participation. Throughout the decade, the Society placed increasing emphasis on social justice; closing the gap between the classes (and thus restoring the egalitarianism of the early Muslims) became one of its main objectives, and Banna voiced ever stronger criticisms of the upper class and the class system as a whole:

Islam is equal for all people and prefers nobody to others on the grounds of differences in blood or race, forefathers or descent, poverty or wealth. According to Islam everyone is equal... However, in deeds and natural gifts, then the answer is yes. The learned is above the ignorant... Thus, we see that Islam does not approve of the class system.

As this ideology took shape over the next two decades, in the absence of a strong socialist party, the Brotherhood called for nationalisation of industries, substantial state intervention in the economy, a greatly reduced maximum wage for senior civil servants, laws to protect workers against exploitation, an Islamic banking system to provide interest-free loans, and generous social welfare programmes, including unemployment benefits, public housing and ambitious health and literacy programmes, funded by higher taxes on the wealthy. By 1948 the Brotherhood was advocating land reform to enable small farmers to own land.

Secondly, Banna's ideology was an attempt to bringing about social renewal through a modern interpretation of Islam. In his view, Egypt was torn between two failed value systems: on the one hand, a doctrinaire religious traditionalism (represented by Al-Azhar University), which Banna saw as anachronistic and irrelevant to the urgent problems faced by ordinary people, and on the other hand, an abandonment of all moral values and an economic free-for-all that impoverished the masses and enabled foreign interests to take control of the economy. He argued that Islam should not be confined to the narrow domain of private life, but should rather be applied to the problems of the modern world, and used as the moral foundation of a national renaissance, a thoroughgoing reform of political, economic and social systems.

The Brotherhood has sometimes been incorrectly described as advocating a blanket rejection of everything Western; in reality, Banna did not hesitate to draw on Western as well as Islamic thought in the pursuit of this modern approach to Islam, using quotations from authors such as René Descartes, Isaac Newton and Herbert Spencer to support his own arguments. He proposed to send Brotherhood journalists to study journalism at the American University in Cairo, and suggested that another group of Brothers attend the School of Social Service, another Western school: "its scientific and practical programme will greatly facilitate the training [of the Brothers] in social welfare works". He was in favour of the teaching of foreign languages in schools: "We need to drink from the springs of foreign culture to extract what is indispensable for our renaissance." His formulation of the concept of nationalism, which was fundamental to the Brotherhood's appeal to young people, combined modern European political concepts with Islamic ones. At the same time, Banna and the Brotherhood decried what they saw as their compatriots' slavish adoration of everything Western and their loss of respect for their own culture and history.

Banna's concept of nationalism was emphatically Islamic, and its long-term goal was to see all humanity united by the Muslim faith. However, the Society had no clear definition of the sort of political system it wished for. The idea of reviving the Islamic caliphate (which had been abolished by Kemal Atatürk in 1924) was sometimes mentioned in the Brotherhood's publications, but Banna was not in favour of it. The chief practical consequence of the Brotherhood's Islamic nationalism was an energetic campaign against colonialism in Egypt and other Islamic countries; this was one of the main reasons for the Society's popularity.

The term jihad was a key concept in the Brotherhood's vocabulary: it referred not only to armed struggle to liberate Muslim lands from colonial occupation, but also to the inner effort that Muslims needed to make in order to free themselves from an ingrained inferiority complex and from fatalism and passivity towards their condition. It encompassed the courage to dissent expressed in the maxim "The greatest jihad is to utter a word of truth in the presence of a tyrannical ruler" (a hadith reported by Abu Sa'id al-Khudri) as well as any productive activity that Muslims undertook, on their own initiative, to improve the well-being of the Islamic community.

In keeping with his call for unity among Muslims, Banna advocated tolerance and goodwill between different forms of Islam. Although the Brotherhood rejected the corruption of some Sufi orders and their excessive glorification of their leaders, a kind of reformed Sufi practice was an important part of the Society's structure. The Society thus tried to bridge the gap between the Salafiyya movement and Sufism, and in the 1940s it tried to promote a rapprochement between Sunni Islam and Shi'a Islam. More generally, the Society insisted that its members must not try to impose their vision of Islam on others. Its General Law of 1934 stated that their actions must always reflect "friendliness and gentleness" and that they were to avoid "bluntness, crudeness and abuses in words or hints". Members who violated these principles (e.g. by pressuring unveiled women to veil themselves) were expelled.

The Brotherhood's openness to a diversity of Islamic belief and practice represented part of its appeal to young people. Banna deplored the rigid preoccupation of some Salafiyya societies with minor points of religious doctrine; he felt that Sufism and other traditional practices should be welcomed, and that the Brotherhood should focus on basic social and political issues rather than on theological hair-splitting.

== A political organisation ==
In the early 1930s the Brotherhood started its Rover Scouts programme (jawwala), in which groups of young men were trained in athletics and an ascetic way of life, carried out charitable work, and toured branches of the Brotherhood to strengthen ties between them. The Rover Scouts, whose uniforms, banners and hymns attracted a great deal of attention, became an important means of recruiting new members, and Banna saw them as a way of introducing young men gradually to religion.

In 1931–32, the Brotherhood underwent an internal crisis; several members challenged Banna's control over the Society's treasury, his general stubbornness, and his insistence on having someone of low social status, a carpenter, as his deputy. Banna's candidate for deputy was overwhelmingly supported by a vote in the Society's General Assembly, and his offer to pay the Society's considerable outstanding debts further strengthened his position, but the conflict persisted until he threatened to expel his opponents from the Brotherhood, at which point they resigned. While some of their complaints about him were certainly justified, the conflict also reflected a more basic disagreement with his conception of the Brotherhood's mission. The secessionists felt that the Society should simply be a traditional Islamic welfare society that local notables could support, and should therefore have open accounts and socially respectable leaders.

In the aftermath of this conflict, Banna sought to clarify the basis of leadership in the Society, asserting that moral qualities and personal sacrifice were more important than titles, social standing and formal qualifications. In drafting the Society's General Law in 1934, he increased his own authority over the Brotherhood, insisting that authority within the organisation could only be based on complete confidence in the leadership, rejecting calls for increased consultation (shura) and expressing a deep scepticism towards elections, which he felt had shown their failings during the 1931-32 crisis. He also instituted mediation committees to help defuse conflicts as they arose.

Banna then began to place more emphasis on the Society's political responsibilities concerning a variety of issues such as prostitution, alcohol, gambling, inadequate religious education in schools, the influence of Christian missionaries and, most importantly, the struggle against imperialism. In response to critics who accused the Brotherhood of being a political group, Banna replied that involvement in politics was part of Islam: "Islam does have a policy embracing the happiness of this world." While other Islamic organisations remained studiously apolitical during the great upheavals that characterised the 20s and 30s in Egypt, the Brotherhood attracted large numbers of young, educated Egyptians, particularly students, by encouraging and supporting them in campaigning for political causes.

The Brotherhood's first foray into active involvement in politics concerned the conflicts in Palestine between Zionism, Palestinian Arab nationalism and British rule. Like many other Egyptian associations, the Society raised money to support Palestinian Arab workers on strike during the 1936–39 Arab revolt in Palestine, and organised demonstrations and speeches in their favour. The Society also called for a boycott of Jewish shops in Cairo, on the grounds that Egyptian Jews were financing Zionist groups in Palestine. Articles hostile towards Jews (and not merely towards Zionism) appeared in its newspaper, though other articles upheld the distinction between Jews and Zionists.

In the mid-1930s the Brotherhood developed a formal hierarchical structure, with the General Guide (Banna) at the top, assisted by a General Guidance Bureau and a deputy. Local branches were organised into districts, whose administration had a large measure of autonomy. There were different categories of members, with increasing responsibilities: "assistant", "associate", "worker" and "activist". Membership fees depended on the means of each member, and poor members paid no fees. Promotion through the hierarchy depended on the performance of Islamic duties and on knowledge attained in the Society's study groups. This merit-based system was a radical departure from the hierarchies based on social standing that characterised Egyptian society at the time.

In 1938, Banna came to the conclusion that local conservative notables had gained too much influence in the Society, and that there were too many members with "empty titles" who did little practical work. To solve these problems, he introduced substantial organisational changes over the next few years; henceforth the branches' executive committees were chosen by the General Guidance Bureau rather than elected, and in 1941 the elected General Assembly was replaced by a smaller appointed body called the Consultative Assembly. However, the Society's structure remained decentralised, so that branches could continue to operate if the police arrested leading members.

Despite Banna's skepticism concerning elections, manifested in their diminishing role within the Brotherhood, he argued for a kind of democracy when he set out his view of the principles underlying a political Islam in 1938:

When one considers the principles that guide the constitutional system of government, one finds that such principles aim to preserve in all its forms the freedom of the individual citizen, to make the rulers accountable for their actions to the people and finally, to delimit the prerogatives of every single authoritative body. It will be clear to everyone that such basic principles correspond perfectly to the teaching of Islam concerning the system of government. For this reason, the Muslim Brothers consider that of all the existing systems of government, the constitutional system is the form that best suits Islam and Muslims.

Such a system would involve elections, but not political parties; Banna rejected party politics, pointing out that the Egyptian political parties of the time were closed off to all but the elites and had become instruments of British imperial rule.

== See also ==
- History of the Muslim Brotherhood in Egypt
