= History of the Muslim Brotherhood in Egypt (1939–1954) =

The History of the Muslim Brotherhood in Egypt (1939–1954) discusses the History of the Muslim Brotherhood in Egypt from its actions during World War II to its official dissolution by the Egyptian government.

== The Second World War ==
In the late 1930s, in keeping with the Muslim Brotherhood's emphasis on actions rather than words, some members pushed for the organisation to form a military wing to take up armed struggle against British imperial rule, and some were already disobeying the Brotherhood's leadership and taking part in isolated clashes with the police. The Brotherhood's General Guide, Hassan al-Banna, felt that the Society was not ready to engage in military campaigns, and that those who wished to do so "might take the wrong course and miss the target". He advocated a more cautious, longer-term plan of forming groups of particularly dedicated members, called "Battalions", who would receive rigorous spiritual and physical training; once their numbers were sufficient, Banna felt, the Battalions would be prepared to engage in warfare. This would not involve terrorist or revolutionary action, which Banna rejected completely, but rather (and only as a last resort, if all peaceful strategies failed) openly declared war on imperial occupation. However, the Battalion system failed to develop on the scale Banna hoped for, and pressure from members for armed struggle against the British continued to increase. In 1939, this internal conflict developed into a major crisis, during which some of the most active cadres left the Society to form a rival organisation called Muhammad's Youth.

The following year, as a result of this conflict, the Brotherhood created a military wing called the secret apparatus, which nevertheless remained mostly inactive during the war years. The future Egypt president Anwar Sadat was an active member of the secret organization as a "Free officer" in the early 1940s.

The Society's official position was that Egypt should refrain from participating in the Second World War. In 1940, in order to ensure Egypt's support of the war effort, which initially seemed to be going very badly for the Allies, Britain replaced the Egyptian government with one whose cooperation it could be sure of. Martial law was imposed, and in 1941 some public figures that Britain considered subversive were arrested. Hassan al-Banna was imprisoned twice (only to be released within weeks), the Brotherhood's journals were suppressed, its meetings were banned and any reference to it in newspapers was forbidden.

The Brotherhood's leadership was keen to avoid confrontations that could give the government a pretext to suppress the Society altogether. During the war, the Society alternated between avoiding sensitive issues in the interest of self-preservation, and taking risky political positions such as calling for the nationalisation of the Suez Canal Company. During the periods when it kept a low profile, it concentrated on maintaining and expanding its membership base and extending its social welfare programmes, which included humanitarian assistance to the victims of Axis bombings of Egyptian cities. In 1943, the Society replaced its Battalion system with a form of internal organisation called "families", a hierarchy of close-knit groups of five members each; members of a family met regularly, usually in their own homes, and assumed responsibility for one another's welfare.

Shortages and bombings contributed to political unrest; after a mass demonstration of students in February 1942, the government resigned. British troops then surrounded the king's palace and forced him to accept a government headed by the Wafd party (thus durably damaging the Wafd's credibility in the eyes of Egyptians). The Wafd remained entirely loyal to the British throughout the war, as did the Sa'dist government that followed it in February 1945.

The first act of the Wafd government installed by the British in 1942 was to dissolve parliament and call for elections. When Banna declared his candidacy, prime minister Nahhas Pasha pressured him to withdraw it. He agreed, but in return he obtained the prime minister's promise that the Brotherhood could resume its normal activities, and that the government would take action to curtail prostitution and the sale of alcoholic drinks. Shortly afterward, the government did indeed make prostitution illegal, and restricted the sale of alcohol, particularly on religious holidays. The Brotherhood was allowed to resume some of its work, but for the next several years the government alternated between repression and friendliness towards the organisation.

During the 1940s, the Brotherhood's membership continued to grow; by 1948, it had two thousand branches, and is thought to have had over a million members.

== Postwar nationalism ==
The candidacies of Banna and several other Brothers were defeated in the rigged 1945 elections, even in their stronghold of Isma'iliyya. The Society's exclusion from parliamentary politics tended to strengthen the position of those members who advocated a more radical confrontation with the state, and to make them increasingly unwilling to submit to Banna's insistence on nonviolent action.

The presence of Allied troops had created many jobs and led to the establishment of trade unions; after the war, the departure of most of those troops left many unemployed. Inflation rose, the gap between rich and poor widened and wages decreased. During the war, propaganda had poured into Egypt from all sides of the conflict: British and American propaganda about democracy and national independence from Nazi and Soviet aggression, German propaganda about Egyptian and Arab liberation from Western imperialism, and Soviet propaganda about Soviet economic power and social justice. Britain's occupation of Egypt and the conflict in Palestine remained unresolved. Frustration with the political and economic order was endemic, communist ideas were widespread, and activist groups in general found it easy to attract new members.

In September 1945 the Society adopted a new constitution which formally recognised the structures put in place during the 1938 reorganisation. It also submitted its records to the ministry of social affairs as required by law, and was classified as a "political, social and religious institution"; this meant that the government assistance given to charities would only be available for some of its activities. The organisation's social welfare activities were therefore split off into a separate section with its own director and hierarchy, in order to better protect them from political interference.

During the post-war years the Brotherhood grew rapidly. It continued to expand its social welfare activities, setting up hospitals, clinics and pharmacies; schools offering technical and academic courses for boys, girls and adults; and small factories to help remedy post-war unemployment.

Egypt's ruling elites were vehemently opposed to communism, and in this, the Brotherhood agreed wholeheartedly with them; the government therefore made attempts to use the Brotherhood as an instrument against its communist opponents. However, conflict between the elites and the Brotherhood was inevitable, because like the communists, the Brothers were activists who appealed to widespread dissatisfaction with the existing social order, and aspired to bring about profound changes to remedy the injustices of Egyptian society.

The Brotherhood's publications expressed unrelenting hostility towards the government and its policies, and the Brothers were a major force in strikes and nationalist demonstrations. In October 1945, the Society organised a "people's congress" on national liberation in Cairo and seven other cities. The Brotherhood and the Wafd were now the two main opposition parties; now that the Wafd was no longer in power, it was just as eager to champion the nationalist cause, and was supported on this issue by the communists. The Brothers therefore found themselves in direct competition with the Wafd for leadership of the nationalist movement. Despite their deep mutual distrust, the two groups joined in the same mass demonstrations on occasion. However, the Brotherhood's refusal to cooperate with communists led to the breakdown of a united front, and to accusations that the Brothers were tools of the government and of the ruling class. The Society strongly rebutted these charges, and indeed organised strikes of its own; this deeply strained its already poor relations with the government, and the Brotherhood became the target of police harassment and arrests. The youth of the two groups repeatedly came to blows in 1946, and Banna was nearly killed by a bomb attack. After these clashes, representatives of the Brotherhood and the Wafd held secret meetings in order to reach an understanding; this considerably reduced the tensions between the two groups.

In the same year, prime minister Sidqi Pasha returned from negotiations in London with a draft treaty that the nationalist groups found absolutely unacceptable. Violent student riots broke out. Members of the Brotherhood's secret apparatus started to carry out attacks on Britons as well as on Egyptian police stations, and continued to do so over the next few years. The government responded to this escalating violence with harsh repressive measures, including a wave of arrests among the Brothers and other nationalist groups. Rioting continued throughout 1946, and in December the government resigned.

In July 1947, having accompanied the new prime minister, Mahmud Fahmi al-Nuqrashi Pasha, to the United Nations, a representative of the Brothers, Mustafa Mu'min, interrupted the UN Security Council discussions on Egypt to make a speech from the spectator's gallery, rejecting all negotiations with Britain and calling for a complete and immediate British withdrawal from Egypt. However, the Security Council took no action.

In Egypt and among Arabs and Muslims generally, the cause of Palestine continued to inspire strong sympathies; the 1947 UN resolution on the partition of Palestine gave the issue a greater urgency. The Brotherhood sent volunteers to fight in the 1948 Arab–Israeli War. During the war, there were numerous bomb attacks on Jews in Cairo; in the "jeep case" discussed below, it emerged that members of the Society's secret apparatus had been responsible for at least some of these.

In March 1948, members of the secret apparatus assassinated judge, Ahmed El-Khazindar Bey, President of the Court of Appeal, who had given a prison sentence to a Muslim Brother for attacking British soldiers. Banna expressed his revulsion at the assassination.

In December 1948, the Egyptian government released a decree ordering the dissolution of the Society. The police had discovered caches of bombs and other weapons accumulated by the secret apparatus, and though the Brothers insisted that these were for use in the Arab–Israeli war, the government suspected that the Brothers were planning revolution; it was also keen to remove what it saw as one of the main causes of the general political unrest that had become increasingly violent, and increasingly threatening to its authority, since the end of the Second World War. Moreover, because the Brotherhood had its own hospitals, factories and schools, as well as an army in the form of the secret apparatus, the government saw it as a potential parallel state, which Egyptians might come to see as more legitimate than the official one.

Aside from charges of involvement in violent attacks against police and foreigners, the government accused the Society of encouraging workers and farmers to go on strike to demand higher wages and ownership of farmland. Many members of the Brotherhood were arrested, and Banna was kept under close police surveillance. Weeks later, with the organisation's hierarchy and communications thoroughly disrupted, a Muslim brother assassinated prime minister Nuqrashi.

Banna condemned this assassination, and tried without success to negotiate with the new government. In January 1949 the police foiled an attempt by a member of the secret apparatus to bomb a courthouse. Banna wrote an open letter repudiating this act, stating that the perpetrators were "neither Brothers nor Muslims", and called on members of the Brotherhood to refrain from violence and intimidation. The new prime minister, 'Abd al-Hadi, attempted to suppress all dissent by terrorising the population with brutal repressive measures, including the systematic use of torture in the prisons.

Banna wrote a pamphlet in which he rejected all the charges against the Brotherhood and condemned once again the acts of violence committed by its members, including the attacks on Jews; he said the Society's leaders would never have condoned this violence, and had been unable to prevent it because arrests and surveillance had made it impossible for them to exercise their authority. Nevertheless, he argued that these events were, in part, a result of the government's behaviour and the war in Palestine. He denied that the Society had been planning revolution, insisting that its arms had been intended for use only in Palestine in its legitimate partnership with the Arab League. In February 1949, Banna was assassinated by the political police, probably on the orders of the prime minister and the palace.

In May 1949, after a wave of arrests, a group of Brothers made an unsuccessful attempt to assassinate prime minister 'Abd al-Hadi, leading to still more arrests. By July, some 4,000 Brothers were in prison, where they continued to maintain their organisation (Mitchell 1969, 80). Several trials followed; in one of these, Nuqrashi's assassin was condemned and put to death. The prosecution attempted to show that Banna had been responsible for the assassination, while the defence argued that he had been unable to maintain control over "extremists" in the secret apparatus; the court seems to have considered the latter view to be more plausible.

In the only other trial to reach a conclusion (the "jeep case"), thirty-two Brothers were accused of conspiring to overthrow the government by means of terrorism, using illegal stockpiles of weapons, and of organising the murders of judge Khazindar and prime minister Nuqrashi. The prosecution attempted to show that revolution was the Society's real objective, concealed by the façade of its other activities.

The defence acknowledged that members of the secret apparatus had formed a terrorist organisation, but maintained that in doing so, they had disobeyed the Brotherhood's leaders and violated its principles. It argued that the Society's activities and objectives were mainly peaceful, and that its weapons and military training were intended only for the legitimate defence of Arabs and Muslims against the British occupation of Egypt and against Zionism in Palestine. The court ruled in favour of the defence. Most of the defendants were acquitted, and the others were given lenient sentences.

After the Wafd returned to power in 1950, the Brothers attempted to negotiate with the new government to have the Society legalised again, but could not reach an agreement. Martial law was ended, and all its provisions were abrogated except those that applied to the Brothers. Parliament passed a "Societies Law" that specifically targeted the Brotherhood without mentioning it by name, requiring a description and photograph of every member to be given to the authorities. The ministry of the interior announced that it intended to buy the Society's headquarters and use the building as a police station. The Brotherhood resolved all these issues by means of a successful court case, gaining the right to operate legally and the return of its confiscated property.

== Revolution and its Aftermath ==
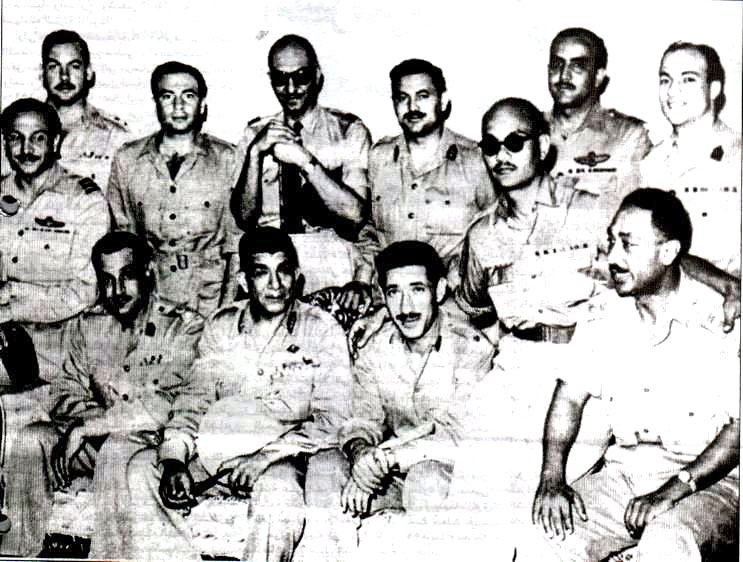
The Free Officers in 1952, showing -sitting in the first lane- Nasser and Sadat (who were members of the Muslim Brotherhood in the 1940s)

While the Brotherhood was outlawed, competition to replace Hassan al-Banna became intense. Finally, in 1951, in a move that contravened the Society's constitution, an outsider was chosen as Banna's successor: Hassan Isma'il al-Hudaybi, an experienced judge known for his strong aversion to violence, who, it was felt, would give the Society greater respectability. Though not a member, Hudaybi had long been an admirer of Banna. He resigned from the bench in order to become the Society's General Guide, but soon realised that he was meant to be a mere figurehead, and that longstanding members resented his attempts to exercise authority. He spoke out against the secret apparatus and attempted to dissolve it, but only succeeded in alienating its members, who considered themselves fighters in a noble cause.

On 8 October 1951, the Egyptian prime minister, Nahhas Pasha, unilaterally abrogated the Anglo-Egyptian Treaty of 1936. This triggered mass demonstrations in support of Egyptian independence; with the help of the army, large numbers of nationalist activists, including many members of the Brotherhood, began preparing for armed conflict with the British in the Canal Zone. Hudaybi, maintaining his opposition to violent action, publicly repudiated these preparations, and appeared to support the palace's intentions to stifle the nationalist movement. This deepened the conflict between Hudaybi and his opponents in the organisation, especially those within the secret apparatus.

Over the next few months, anti-government riots broke out, expressing the nationalist movement's frustration with the government's failure to follow up the abrogation of the treaty with decisive action. On 25 January 1952, British forces attacked an Egyptian police station in the Canal Zone and a pitched battle ensued. The next day, in Cairo, students, police and officers marched together to the parliament to demand a declaration of war against Britain; meanwhile thousands of rioters set fire to the city, leaving much of central Cairo in ruins. The Brotherhood did not participate as an organisation, and Hudaybi issued a statement repudiating the riots, but individual members were involved. Several new governments followed in rapid succession. On 23 July the Free Officers, led by Muhammad Naguib, took power, overthrowing the monarchy; the coup was greeted with enthusiasm throughout Egypt.

The Brotherhood played a supporting but not crucial role in the revolution. Members of the Free Officers, including Gamal Abdel Nasser (who was to become the leader of the new regime) and Anwar al-Sadat, had had close contacts with the Muslim Brotherhood since the 1940s, and some were members of the Society (Nasser himself may have been one of these). Members of the Brotherhood had fought alongside the officers in Palestine, and had been armed and trained by them for deployment in the Canal Zone in the year preceding the revolution. Despite Hudaybi's ambivalence, the Brotherhood had agreed to assist the revolution, mostly by maintaining order, protecting foreigners and minorities and encouraging popular support for the army coup.

After the revolution, relations between the Brotherhood and the junta were initially cordial but quickly soured. Among the reasons for this were the army's unwillingness to share political power, the Brotherhood's insistence on the promulgation of an Islamic constitution, and Hudaybi's deep distrust of Nasser. In 1953, the government abolished all political parties and organisations except the Muslim Brotherhood. It then created a new party, the Liberation Rally, intended to win over those Egyptians who remained sceptical about the revolution, and suggested that the Brotherhood should merge with the Liberation Rally. Having alienated all other political groups, the regime could not yet afford to dispense with the Brotherhood's support, but was unwilling to give it a greater role in government.

Hudaybi was then subjected to fierce criticism from within the organisation, partly because of the government's efforts to discredit him; his critics felt he had transformed the Society into "a party of aristocrats" and "a movement of words, not action". This led to a debate about the authoritarian character of the Society's institutions. Some felt that a system based on obedience and loyalty to the leader had been acceptable under Banna because he had won the members' trust; since Hudaybi had been unable to do so, they began to press for more democratic structures. Despite these criticisms, Hudaybi mustered strong support from the Brotherhood's leaders as well as from the rank and file. The secret apparatus was formally dissolved and its leaders expelled.

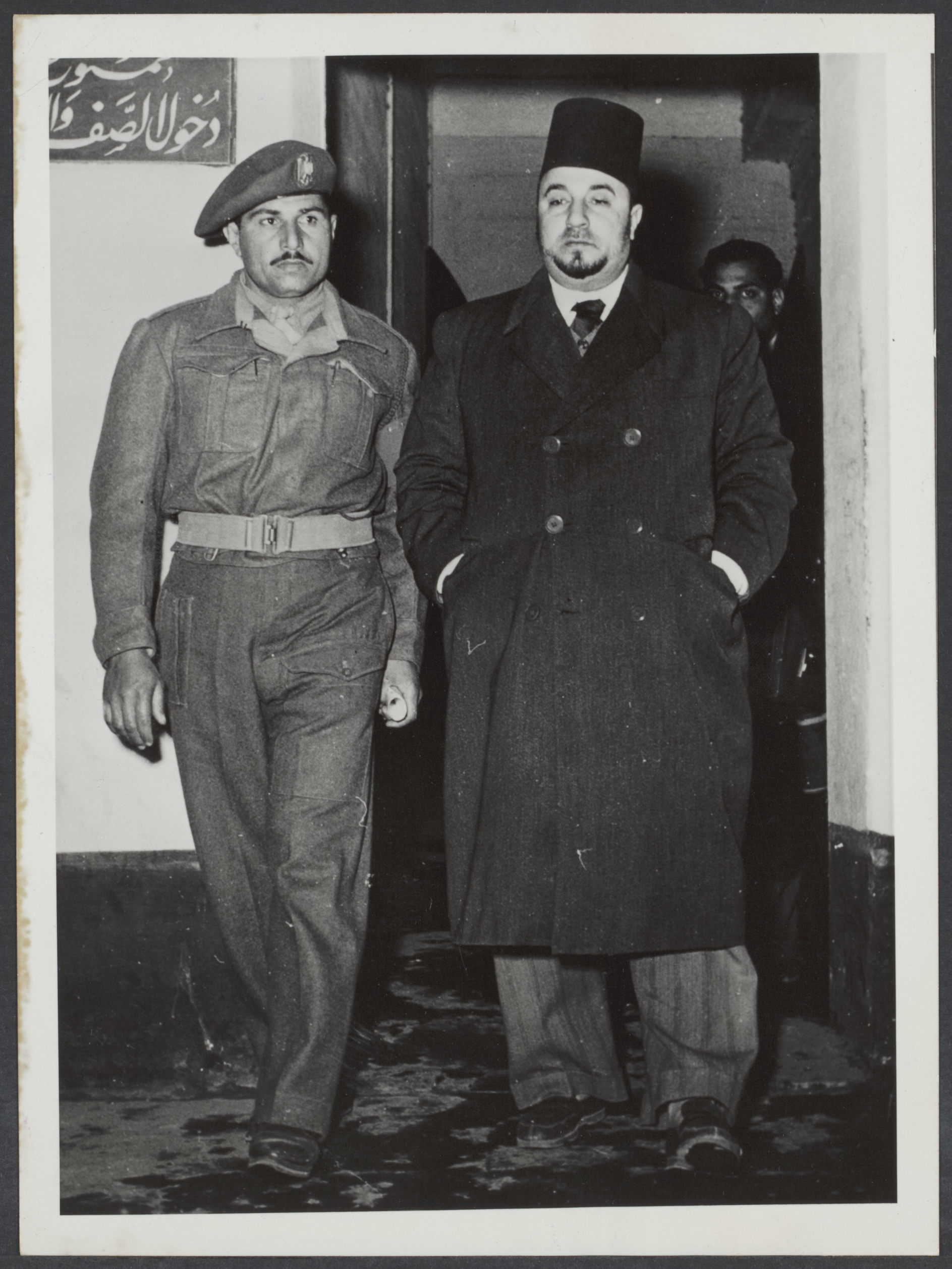
Members of the Muslim Brotherhood arrested in January 1954. Abed Hakim Abdin, secretary of the Muslim Brotherhood, after his arrest.

In January 1954, the regime sent members of the Liberation Rally to disrupt a Muslim Brothers student gathering using loudspeakers; the confrontation turned into a battle. The government then decreed that the Muslim Brotherhood was to be dissolved, on the grounds that Hudaybi and his supporters had been planning to overthrow the government; he was arrested along with hundreds of others. The junta's use of repressive measures to safeguard its power, which was seen as Nasser's policy in particular, caused its popularity to plummet; this led to anti-Nasser demonstrations and a power struggle between him and General Naguib, and appeared to threaten to end the revolution and restore the old political order. Hudaybi sided with Nasser and with the revolution, earning the release of most of the imprisoned Brothers and the restoration of the Society's authorisation to operate legally. However, the events of January had rankled many members, who now felt that the secret apparatus should not have been abolished after all; it was therefore rebuilt under a new leadership without Hudaybi's knowledge.

The regime's failure to keep some of the promises it had made to the Society (e.g. concerning the release of prisoners) soon caused their relations to deteriorate again. In a leaked letter to the government, Hudaybi called for the lifting of martial law, a return to parliamentary democracy and an end to press censorship. Meanwhile, Britain and Egypt had resumed negotiations regarding the Suez Canal. An agreement on the terms of a new treaty was announced; Hudaybi immediately criticised it as too generous towards the British and a threat to Egyptian sovereignty. The government then began using police to provoke violent confrontations with the Brotherhood at peaceful gatherings in mosques and other places; a Brotherhood clinic was raided and destroyed. In each case the government blamed the Brothers for instigating the clashes. Hudaybi went into hiding, and the official press launched a vitriolic campaign to discredit him. The government declared that several Brothers who were travelling abroad were guilty of treason, and stripped them of their Egyptian citizenship.

Disagreements within the Society over Hudaybi's criticisms of the government then came to the fore, and Nasser personally made strenuous efforts to persuade the Brotherhood's leaders to have Hudaybi removed from his position. This conflict had the effect of discrediting not only Hudaybi but the rest of the leadership as well. The treaty with Britain was signed on 19 October 1954. Hudaybi and other Brotherhood leaders felt it was much better than the previously announced terms, but according to one version of events, the secret apparatus, now invisible and unaccountable to those not involved in it, saw the treaty it as a betrayal of Egypt and decided to act on its own. On 26 October, a member of the secret apparatus fired shots at Nasser while the latter was making a speech; unharmed, Nasser stood firm and finished his speech, declaring that he was ready to die for his country. There are, however, some indications that Nasser and his close associates may have staged the assassination attempt; what is certain is that they had been considering doing so.

The attempt on Nasser's life gave his popularity a much-needed boost, enabled him to prevail in his power struggle with Naguib, and provided him with the perfect opportunity to eliminate the Brotherhood. The organisation was officially dissolved, its headquarters burned, and thousands of its members arrested. The government organised spectacular trials with little regard for due process of law, while the official press accused Hudaybi and his organisation of every conceivable sort of conspiracy. Six Brothers were hanged, and seven, including Hudaybi, were sentenced to life imprisonment with hard labour.

== See also ==
- History of the Muslim Brotherhood in Egypt
