= Hamed Nada =

Egyptian artist (1924-1990)

Hamed Nada (1924-1990) was an Egyptian artist born in a popular neighbourhood in Citadel, one of the oldest districts in Cairo. Much of his early art resembles memories of his childhood and life growing up in his neighbourhood and communal home. In his neighbourhood in which he grew up, there is a mosque named Sayeda Zeinab. It is named after the Prophet Mohammad's daughter, Zeinab. Nada's father was a large influence in the administration of this mosque. Nada's art related to forms of symbolism, spirituality, life and a stylized way of depicting the Muslim spirit of djinn. From an early age, Nada was introduced to Egyptian culture in an artistic way, through mentors and self interest. He influenced much of the modern art in Egypt as the Post-Colonial modern era of art was beginning during his career. His membership in various art groups and institutions express his influence in the art world. The intricate symbolism found in his pieces show the deep focus of his personal style.

== Education and career ==
Hamed Nada's life was very closely tied to Islam, and was influenced by the Muslim Brotherhood of Sayeda Zeinab in his neighbourhood. His religious childhood remained close to him, although he found new interests in secondary school relating to art, psychology and philosophy. During these years, Nada would be taught art techniques by his teacher, Hussein Youssef Amin (1904-1984), in locations that were near the pyramids outside of his teachers villa. Later on in his life, Nada studied at the Royal Academy of Fine Arts of San Fernando, Madrid, and in 1977 became the head of the painting department.

Nada was a teacher to many students throughout his career. He mentored many Egyptian artists, including Khaled Hafez. In an interview with Khaled Hafez, he characterized Nada as a loud teacher, who liked to make jokes, but when it came time for him to critique his students work, they were often afraid of his bluntness. Even with this trait, his studio and classrooms were filled with love and commitment to the art of painting, showing an appreciation for his profession, and his students.

== Artistic style and influences ==
Hamed Nada's artistic style relates to his personality and overall faithful expression. This trait that Hamed Nada had introduced the artistic preservation of Egyptian culture in the 20th century. Throughout his artistic career, he has had many influences, such as schoolfriend Adbel Hadi El Gazzar (1925-1965) and The Contemporary Art Group created with his peers. In the 1940's, Hamed Nada was a co-founder and member of The Contemporary Art Group in Cairo, creating art pieces that resembled his life, and referencing folklore or magic, specifically in his 1989 piece the Fortune Teller and the Cat. Additionally, his Muslim faith allowed him to express various themes through spiritual beings. One being the spirit of djinn. This spiritual being is said to be hidden from view, but present in many faiths, including Islam. In the Quran for example, djinn is mentioned thirty nine times, and is said to share human like traits such as intellect and discrimination, while also striving for freedom. This connection Nada makes between his art and faith show how much of an influence his spirituality has on his creativity.

Many of the Egyptian artists of this time were faced with the historical Islamic characteristics of art, as well as the Western characteristics brought through colonialism and occupation. The incorporation of non-Egyptian styles went against traditional Islamic art styles which included calligraphy, floral and geometric motifs. The differences between Islamic art style and Western Expressionism became an overall characteristic for Egyptian artists in this time. Not only was Hamed Nada influenced by Islam and Egyptian culture, but a large amount of his work is connected to Western Expressionism, and other classic European influences. Through this, Nada was concerned with themes regarding the metaphysical, religious aspects of Egyptian stories and psychology. Psychology is where he found interest for expressing the connections between inner and outer human experiences.

== Modern era of art in the Middle East ==
The Middle East adopted the modern art style in the mid twentieth century, incorporating many artistic institutions in countries such as Egypt, Iraq, Lebanon, and Syria. Before these institutions came to the Middle East, these artists had to travel to Europe to practice their techniques. The addition of artistic institutions into the Middle East allowed for artists to reclaim the narrative that previously claimed their art as being non-art. This adoption ultimately shifted how modernity in art was seen. It started with the adoption of Western styles in the first half of the twentieth century, but by the second half, it was a form of reconquering the past. Hamed Nada's career began during the time of the Modern Era in Egypt, which allowed him to explore the techniques relevant to what made him so influential. This push for modern art in Egypt sheds light on the power and importance of Muslim inclusion in global modernism of not only art, but politics, culture and trade. The Modern Era of art in the Middle East is influentially connected to the struggles and push for independence. Much of this push for independence can be seen through art made by The Contemporary Art Group.

== The Contemporary Art Group ==
Hamed Nada, and his peers co-founded The Contemporary Art Group (Jama’at al-Fann al-Mu’asir) in 1946. Some of his partners in this foundation were Hussein Yousef Amin (1904-1984), Abdel Hadi El-Gazzar (1925-1966), Kamal Youssef (1890-1971) and Samir Rafi (1926-2004). This art group was influenced by the Art and Liberty group of Egypt which advocated for many things through their art. Much of the work The Contemporary Art Group produced differed in styles from each member and led them to relate their art to their own lives. Many artists in this group based their art on their dreams, and surrealist processes and aesthetic. The shift away from colonial narratives through art is a common practice as it allows for cultural and self identity. Abdel Hadi El-Gazzar, among others reference the need to shift from French elitist colonial sentiments, making their art and stylistic themes more accessible to society. This Contemporary Art Group focussed on taking the art style dominated by the West and changed it by exploring the daily lives of the people of Egypt. They focussed on issues such as poverty and oppression, and incorporated mythology and popular culture.

== Specific pieces ==
Through Nada's expression of the inner and outer human experience, his painting, Lamp of Gloom (1948) represents the a symbol of humanity's world, with the three individuals representing stages of life Additionally, Nada would often incorporate traditional folklore into his pieces, which is found in the Fortune Teller and the Cat (1989). This painting refers to the belief of achieving luck and fortune, which is a symbol found in many part of the piece. The hand hanging in the background, along with the tattoo on the child's arm, both allude to luck and protection over evil, a symbol often found in the mosque when attending with his father.
