= History of the Muslim Brotherhood in Egypt (1954–present) =

The History of the Muslim Brotherhood in Egypt (1954–present) encompasses the History of the Muslim Brotherhood in Egypt from its suppression under Nasser to its formation into the largest opposition bloc in the Egyptian parliament. The Brotherhood operates under the slogan "Islam Is the Solution," and aims to establish a democratically introduced civic Islamic state. It has been described as "a deeply entrenched force, with hundreds of thousands of members and affiliates across the Middle East".

== The Brotherhood under Nasser, 1954–1970 ==
Throughout the rule of Gamal 'Abd al-Nasser in Egypt, after many assassination attempts and terrorist plots against the State many members of the Muslim Brotherhood were held in concentration camps, where they were tortured. Those who escaped arrest went into hiding, both in Egypt and in other countries. One of those tortured was Sayyid Qutb, former editor of the Society's newspaper, a prolific writer of fiction, literary criticism and articles on political and social issues, and author of the bestseller Social Justice in Islam, which set out the principles of an Islamic socialism. He became the Brotherhood's most influential thinker for a time, and in 1959 the organization's General Guide, Hassan Isam'il al-Hudaybi, gave him responsibility for the Brothers detained in prisons and concentration camps. Qutub attempted to interpret the situation in the camps in Islamic terms; these reflections, which he circulated as commentaries on passages from the Qur'an, came to encompass an analysis of the regime that meted out such barbarous treatment to its prisoners.

Outside the prisons, those Brothers who had gone underground began to reorganise. In 1956, those who had been imprisoned but not judged were released. Zaynab al-Ghazali, head of the Association of Muslim Women, organized charitable work to meet the basic needs of these now-impoverished Brothers. Along with Brotherhood leader 'Abd al Fattah Isma'il, she went on to play a key role in rebuilding the organization. While Al-Ghazali's focus was on Islamic education, other autonomous groups of Brothers also appeared, who were impatient to avenge the suppression of the Brotherhood in 1954. They found the analytical framework and political programme they were looking for in Qutb's writings, which were circulated by Al-Ghazali and in which his assessment of the Nasser regime, and of the way in which it could be overcome, was gradually taking shape.

In 1964, Qutb was released for several months, and his book Milestones was published; it was reprinted five times in six months. In it, Qutb argued that humanity was in the midst of a profound crisis caused by the failure to adopt a value system that could allow human beings to live in harmony; the threat of nuclear war was a symptom of this ailment. The value systems that dominated the world had failed to live up to their promises. The Western world's concept of democracy, based on an individualistic ideology, had led to vast social injustice, colonialism and the domination of human beings by capital. In the Eastern Bloc, collectivist ideology had failed as well: Marxism had lost touch with its original principles, and had become the ideology of oppressive states. Qutb saw Islam as the solution to humanity's predicament: the entire world (including Egypt) was living in a state of jahiliyya, which can be roughly translated as a way of life characterized by ignorant hostility towards god's will. In particular, human beings erred in allowing themselves to establish their own value systems, instead of accepting god's sovereignty.

Although the theme of the failure of both capitalism and socialism was not new in the Brotherhood's discourse, the application of the concept of jahiliyya to Egyptian society represented an innovation, motivated in part by Qutb's personal experience of the brutality of what had become a totalitarian state.

In order to play its proper role, Islam needed to find tangible expression in an Ummah, a society of people whose lives were fully in accord with Islamic ethics. A vanguard of believers was needed to begin creating the Ummah, which would then grow until it encompassed the entire world. Qutb meant for his book to provide "milestones" tracing the path that this vanguard should follow. Faced with a totalitarian state, he advised them to prepare a jihad whose military aspect went beyond self-defence, and aimed to overthrow those who had usurped the sovereignty that should be God's alone. Qutb's view was that this preparation would take up to fifteen years.

Milestones gave rise to debates within the Brotherhood between young activists who favoured an immediate coup, and more experienced members such as Zaynab al-Ghazali, who took the view that the organisation should limit itself, for decades if need be, to educational work until it had 75% of the population on its side. In August 1965, the government claimed to have discovered that the Brotherhood was organising a huge revolutionary plot. About 18,000 people were arrested, 100–200 were imprisoned, and 38 of these were killed in custody during the investigation. The police made systematic use of torture during interrogations; many, including Sayyid Qutb and Zaynab al-Ghazali, were tortured for months. The police destroyed the village of Kardasa, where the police believed a suspect was hiding, and arrested and tortured its entire population. Raids throughout Egypt were accompanied by an intense media campaign against the Brotherhood. On the basis of confessions obtained under torture, Qutb and two other Brothers were hanged in August 1966. In the 1970s, it emerged that the plot had probably been fabricated by the security services as part of a conflict between different factions within the regime.

After Qutb's death, his ideas remained influential but controversial within the Brotherhood. Some of the younger Brothers interpreted Qutb's analysis to mean that anyone who failed to revolt against a tyrannical regime, or whose government was not based on Islamic law, should be regarded as excommunicated; they saw this as a justification of a revolutionary strategy. The Brotherhood's leadership, which favoured a reformist approach, disagreed, pointing out that it is sufficient to utter a profession of faith twice in order to become a Muslim, and that though there are Muslims who sin, this is not considered grounds for excommunication. In contrast to those young Brothers who advocated revolution, the leadership maintained the view that the organisation should rely on educational work in order to reform Egyptian society. This policy, which has characterised the Brotherhood ever since, earned it the scorn of revolutionary Islamic militant groups.

== The Brotherhood Under Sadat, 1970–1981 ==
Nasser's successor, Anwar al-Sadat, introduced a policy of economic liberalisation and, to a much lesser extent, political liberalisation. In 1971 the concentration camps were closed, and the regime began to gradually release the imprisoned Brothers, though the organisation itself remained illegal; the last of those still behind bars regained their freedom in the general amnesty of 1975. The Brotherhood did not officially designate a new General Guide after Hudaybi's death in 1973; Umar Talmasani became its most prominent spokesperson. Although the organisation refused to give its allegiance to Sadat, its critics on the Egyptian left chastised it for not taking a clear stand against the regime and against economic inequality. Its members came to include many successful businessmen who had profited from Sadat's free-market economic policies (infitah).

The Brotherhood's main political demand during this period was the application of shari'a law; the government responded by initiating a lengthy review of all Egyptian law to determine how best to harmonise it with shari'a. In 1980, the constitution was amended to state that shari'a "is the main source of all legislation".

Another important objective for the Brotherhood was to persuade the government to allow it to operate legally and to act as a political party, whose representatives would stand for office in Parliament. This request was not granted, and the Political Parties Law of 1977 specifically prohibited parties based on religious affiliation. However, the Brotherhood was tolerated to an extent, and in 1976 it was allowed to publish its monthly newspaper, Al-Da'wa ("The Invitation to Islam"), whose circulation is estimated to have reached 100,000 before it was shut down in 1981.

Al-Da'wa often focused on the problem of Palestine; its editors disapproved of the Camp David accords of 1978 and the peace treaty signed by Egypt and Israel in 1979, arguing that Israel would never accept a peaceful and just solution to the conflict. Articles in Al-Da'wa tended to portray all Jews, whether Israeli or not, as inherently untrustworthy and guilty of the injustice endured by the Palestinians, and repeated myths typical of anti-Semitic texts. At the same time, and often in the same articles, the paper continued to reject Arab nationalism. The editors also condemned Christian evangelism, communism and secularism.

Scholars differ on the Brotherhood's influence on Egyptian politics in the 1970s, but it seems clear that other Islamic political movements came to play a more important role. After Egypt's defeat in the 1967 war with Israel, students and workers had protested against the regime's failure to take responsibility for the defeat, and began to call for a more democratic political system. The broad student movement which took shape was at first mainly secular in nature, but student Islamic groups gradually came to the fore, thanks to their ability to implement practical solutions to problems faced by students in their daily life (such as severe overcrowding), by means of the national student union in which they were increasingly elected to positions of responsibility. When Sadat's economic policies caused severe price increases for basic necessities and appalling degradations in public services (leading to huge riots in January 1977), these groups gained influence outside universities as well. Al-Da'wa supported the student Islamic movement, and leaders of the Muslim Brotherhood were invited to speak at large, festive gatherings organised by student groups on Islamic holidays. When the government began to obstruct the student movement, and then to attack it using riot police, the Brotherhood's relations with the government soured as well.

The Brotherhood's spokespeople consistently rejected the revolutionary and terrorist violence of the militant Islamic groups that appeared in Egypt during the 1970s (such as Al-Jihad, which assassinated Sadat in October 1981). At the same time, they argued that increasingly brutal police persecution was largely to blame for this radicalisation, and that if the Brotherhood were legalised, it would be able to help prevent extremism by providing Islamic education to young people. These arguments fell on deaf ears; in the months before his assassination, while his popularity was plummeting, Sadat ordered massive arrests among all opposition forces, including the Brotherhood. The arrested Brothers were released in January 1982, having been cleared of any wrongdoing.

== The Brotherhood Under Mubarak, 1981–2011 ==
During the presidency of Hosni Mubarak, who succeeded Sadat in 1981 and remained in power until 2011, the Brotherhood's relations with the government are still essentially what they were under Sadat: the Brotherhood is tolerated to a degree, but is officially illegal, is not allowed to distribute literature or assemble in public, and is subject to periodic arrests. It has nevertheless published two newspapers (Liwa' al-islam, "The Banner of Islam", and al-I'tisam, "Adherence"), maintained regional and national offices and made public statements, and books by prominent Brothers are sold in bookshops. The Brotherhood has held to its reformist outlook, pursuing a long-term, gradualist approach to the establishment of an Islamic state with popular consent, by reforming society from the bottom up, using persuasion and other nonviolent means.

The Egyptian Muslim Brotherhood has faced significant repression, with many leaders imprisoned and assets seized. Former President Morsi, who was ousted from power, died in 2019 after being denied medical care in custody. This has limited the group's political and civic participation, potentially pushing some members toward radical factions and violence. While Qatar and Turkey have cultivated ties with the Brotherhood and its offshoots, Saudi Arabia and the UAE have sought to suppress such movements. They advocate for a broad U.S. terrorist designation, despite the Brotherhood's reduced influence over its diffuse network, which comprises various movements and parties.

Despite being outlawed, the Brotherhood has been able to take advantage of political and social developments in Egypt to increase its membership and influence. Egypt's emergency law imposes drastic limits on legal political opposition, and it is widely believed that elections are routinely rigged in favour of the government. However, Islamic charitable organisations and private mosques have flourished; though many of these organisations are apolitical, it is largely within this decentralised network of associations, which pursue different agendas and enjoy different degrees of autonomy from the state, that dissent has found expression. There is also anecdotal evidence that Islamic activists have gained some influence within the state bureaucracy, and that their supporters include many doctors, teachers and administrators. The Muslim Brotherhood has benefited from these developments more than any other Islamic political group, thanks in part to the energetic efforts of a cadre of experienced activists in their thirties and forties, who had honed their skills in the student movement under Sadat and joined the Brotherhood after graduation.

The Brotherhood has been particularly successful at recruiting young people, including university students and recent graduates. Jobs, material goods, and the money needed for a conventional wedding have been increasingly out of reach for young Egyptians, and rampant corruption and a closed, authoritarian political system have bred alienation (ightirab) and despair. The Islamic revival offers a way of life in which young people can be respected for their piety and Islamic learning rather than for their titles or wealth, and in which it is considered admirable to live simply. The view that it is the duty of every Muslim to be involved in political and social reform (which the Brotherhood particularly emphasises) acts as an antidote to political alienation and defeatism, enabling young people to feel more optimistic about the future. Women from lower-middle-class backgrounds have found that stricter religious observance gives them increased respectability, enabling them to disregard other social codes that would otherwise limit their options in areas such as education, career and marriage. Young people's work in the Brotherhood includes organising Islamic seminars and plays, supporting Brotherhood candidates in elections in student unions, professional associations and parliament, and participating in demonstrations.

=== 1980s ===
In the 1980s and early 1990s, more and more of the members of Egypt's leading professional associations were economically disadvantaged university graduates; their votes helped Brotherhood candidates gain large majorities on the executive boards of several of these associations, such as those representing lawyers, doctors, pharmacists, scientists and engineers, defeating government, secular, and militant Islamic candidates in open, competitive elections. Under Brotherhood leadership, several professional associations set up programmes to help remedy practical difficulties faced by young graduates, offering health insurance, low-interest loans and training to fill in the gaps left by inadequate university courses. However, the limited resources available to professional associations did not enable these programmes to have a significant effect, and the Brotherhood's success in this arena was due more to voters' perception of its candidates as honest and motivated by a sense of civic duty, in contrast to the corruption that has often characterised professional associations. These associations gave the Brotherhood a platform from which to criticise Egypt's lack of free parliamentary and presidential elections and the use of torture in prisons, and to call for the repeal of the emergency law.

Parliamentary elections, though largely closed to opposition, give some indication of the Brotherhood's popularity under Mubarak. In the 1984 elections, the Brotherhood was allowed to run candidates for the Wafd party. In 1987 it was permitted to repeat the experiment, this time switching to the Labour Party. In both cases, the party aligned with the Brotherhood received more votes than all the other opposition parties combined.

=== 1990s ===
Starting in about 1992, the government again resorted to repressive measures to stem the Brotherhood's increasing influence. In 1993, professional associations were placed under direct state control. In 1995 and 1996, over a thousand Brothers were arrested. Several were convicted by military tribunals to several years of hard labour; the main charge was that the accused were members of an illegal organisation that planned to overthrow the government. At the same time, the government directed a huge media campaign against the Brotherhood, accusing it of being a terrorist group. This reaction can best be explained as an effort to stave off a nonviolent, popular challenge to the regime's power, by preventing the Brotherhood from participating in elections. Similarly, in 1998, hundreds of student Islamic activists were arrested just before student union elections. The Brotherhood was particularly vulnerable to this crackdown because of its lack of support among the upper middle classes, industrial workers, and the poorest and least educated segments of Egyptian society.

Increased government repression led to a conflict between the Brotherhood's "old guard", which dominated its Guidance Bureau, and its middle generation of leaders, who favoured cooperation with other political trends, a more open internal debate on political issues, a more concerted effort to gain legality for the organisation and a more liberal interpretation of Islam.

On 20 January 1996, Hamid Abu an-Nasr, the General Leader of Egypt's MB died. His successor was MB first deputy, Mustafa Mashhur, who had been "an active member of the underground secret apparatus (al-Jihaz al-Sirri)" as a youth. He had spent a total of 16 years in prison and was considered a hard liner. The Egyptian interior minister, Hasan al-Alfi, responded with a threatening speech and shortly after a raid on the MB central offices and the arrest of 46 members.

Also that year, to the dismay of the Brotherhood's senior leadership, a group of prominent middle-generation leaders left the Brotherhood and joined with several Copts to form a new political party, called Wasat ("Centre"), intended to represent "a civic platform based on the Islamic faith, which believes in pluralism and the alternation of power". The Wasat Party has won the support of some well-known secular intellectuals, but its repeated requests to become a legal political party have been denied.

=== 2000 elections ===
After a period of soul-searching and retrenchment, the Brotherhood has made a comeback in recent years, as its middle-generation leaders have become more influential within the organisation. In 2000, the Brotherhood ran 76 parliamentary candidates as independents (including one woman, Gihan al-Halafawi, whose victory in her district was disqualified when the government cancelled the election there), and won 17 seats (as many as all the other opposition parties combined), despite the government's strenuous media campaign against it and the arrest of several of its candidates shortly before the vote. In 2001, the Lawyers' Association held open elections for its executive board for the first time in five years; in order to avoid embarrassing the regime, the Brotherhood chose to contest only a third of the seats, and won all of those.

In its public statements, the Brotherhood has shed the religious intolerance and anti-Semitism expressed in its newspaper in the 1970s. In recent years its spokespeople have said that Copts are welcome to join the organisation (noting that Hassan al-Banna had two Copts as his assistants, and was known for his lack of prejudice towards Copts); Mohammad Mahdi Akef, who became the Brotherhood's General Guide in 2004 at the age of 75 told Al-Jazeera in 2005:

Islam dignifies Christians and Jews and we hope they treat us the same way. The ignorance of people is what is causing a grudge among them and not their religion.

In recent years, the Brotherhood has frequently called for greater democracy in the Middle East. 'Abd al-Mun'im Abu-l-Futuh, one of the middle-generation leaders who is respected both in the Brotherhood and in the Wasat Party, told the International Crisis Group in 2004:

The absence of democracy is one of the main reasons for the crisis here, in Egypt and the Middle East. The Muslim Brothers believe that the Western governments are one of the main reasons for the lack of democracy in the region because they are supporting dictatorships in the Arab and Islamic region in general, despite the fact that it has been proved that the absence of democracy and freedom is the reason for terrorism and violence.

=== 2005 election ===
In 2005, the Brotherhood began participating in pro-democracy demonstrations with the Egyptian Movement for Change (also known as Kifaya, "enough"), and many of the Brotherhood's members were arrested, over 700 in May 2005 alone.

In the 2005 parliamentary elections, the Brotherhood's candidates, who stood as independents, won 88 seats (20% of the total) to form the largest opposition bloc, despite many violations of the electoral process, including the arrest of hundreds of Brotherhood members. Meanwhile, the legal opposition parties won only 14 seats; this revived the debate among secularists and Coptics about whether is cause for worry over the rise of the Brotherhood.

=== Post-2005 election events ===
The Brotherhood made repeated calls for a more democratic political system in Egypt and participated in pro-democracy demonstrations with the Kifaya movement in 2005. Since 2005 Muslim Brotherhood members in Egypt have also become a significant movement online. In 2006 Abdel Menem Mahmoud created the first publicly identified Brotherhood blog, Ana Ikhwan (http://ana-ikhwan.blogspot.com). In an article for Arab Media & Society (http://www.arabmediasociety.com), Courtney C. Radsch of American University explores how the Egyptian blogosphere expanded as many younger members followed suit, especially the activists who were sympathetic to Kefaya and members who wanted to be part of the discussion about the draft party platform. These "cyberactivists" are often critical of the organization, such as its rejection of women and Copts as being permitted to hold the presidency, and more liberal than their offline counterparts.

Its 2005 success provoked "a government counterattack" against the Brotherhood. Egypt's constitution was amended in 2007 in favor of registered parties and against independents, to the disadvantage of the officially outlawed Brethren which can only field candidates as independents. In 2008 the state disqualified most Brotherhood candidates in the local council elections. The Mubarak regime also launched a wave of arrests and military trials against the Brethren, "ensnared thousands of rank-and-file members," but also important leaders "who ran the financial apparatus that funnels millions of dollars in donations and investment proceeds into campaigning and social outreach." This has weakened the movement, as have some recent controversial positions of the Brotherhood. In 2007 it distributed a draft program for its proposed political party which called for a ban on women or Christians as Egypt's president, and for a special council of Islamic clerics to vet parliamentary legislation. During the 2008-9 Gaza War, some Brotherhood leaders called for Egyptians to go to Gaza and fight Israel, notwithstanding Egypt's 1979 peace treaty with Israel.

== See also ==
- History of the Muslim Brotherhood in Egypt
- Muslim Brotherhood in current politics of Egypt
- Muslim Brotherhood in Egypt
- History of the Republic of Egypt
