= History of the Muslim Brotherhood in Egypt =

History of an Egyptian socio-political movement

The Muslim Brotherhood was founded in Ismailia, Egypt by Hassan al-Banna in March 1928 as an Islamist religious, political, and social movement. The group spread to other Muslim countries, but had its largest, or one of its largest, organizations in Egypt, where for many years it was the biggest, best-organized, and most disciplined political opposition force. This was despite government crackdowns in 1948, 1954, 1965, after plots, or alleged plots, of assassination and subversion were uncovered.

Following the 2011 Revolution the group was legalized, and in April 2011 it launched a civic political party called the Freedom and Justice Party (Egypt). Their party contested elections, including the 2012 presidential election when its candidate Mohamed Morsi became Egypt's first democratically elected president. One year later, however, following massive demonstrations, Morsi was overthrown by the military and arrested. As of 2014, the organization has been declared a terrorist group by Russia, Egypt, UAE, Saudi Arabia and is once again experiencing a severe crackdown.

== History ==
=== 1928–1938 ===
The Muslim Brotherhood was founded in 1928 by Hassan al-Banna, along with six workers of the Suez Canal Company. Al-Banna was a schoolteacher, promoting implementing traditional, religious, Islamic sharia law into government and a social regression based on an Islamic ethos of altruism and civic duty, in opposition to what he saw as political and social injustice and to British imperial rule. The organization initially focused on educational and charitable work, but quickly grew to become a major political force as well, by championing the cause of disenfranchised classes, playing a prominent role in the Egyptian nationalist movement, and promoting a conception of Islam that attempted to restore broken links between tradition and modernity.

=== 1939–1954 ===
On December 28, 1948, Egypt's prime minister, Mahmoud an-Nukrashi Pasha, was assassinated by Brotherhood member and veterinary student Abdel Meguid Ahmed Hassan, in what is thought to have been retaliation for the government crackdown. A month and half later Al-Banna himself was killed in Cairo by men believed to be government agents and/or supporters of the murdered premier. Al-Banna was succeeded as head of the Brotherhood by Hassan Isma'il al-Hudaybi, a former judge.

In 1952, members of the Muslim Brotherhood were accused of taking part in arson that destroyed some "750 buildings" in downtown Cairo — mainly night clubs, theatres, hotels, and restaurants frequented by British and other foreigners — "that marked the end of the liberal, progressive, cosmopolitan" Egypt.

The Brotherhood supported the military coup that overthrew the monarchy in 1952, but the junta was unwilling to share power or lift martial law and clashed with the Brotherhood.

=== 1954–1982 ===
After the attempted assassination of then-president Gamal 'Abd al-Nasser, in 1954, a member of the secret apparatus was accused by the authorities of being the perpetrator of the attempt. Nasser then abolished the Brotherhood and imprisoned and punished thousands of its members.

Many members of the Brotherhood were held for years in prisons and concentration camps, where they were sometimes tortured, during Nasser's rule. In 1964 there was a minor thaw when writer Sayyid Qutb was released from prison only to be arrested again along with his brother Muhammad in August 1965, when he was accused of being part of a plot to overthrow the state—to assassinate the President and other Egyptian officials and personalities—and subjected to what some consider a show trial. The trial culminated in a death sentence for Qutb and six other members of the Muslim Brotherhood and on 29 August 1966, he was executed by hanging.

The CIA funnelled support to the Muslim Brotherhood throughout the Nasser era, the reason being “the Brotherhood’s commendable capability to overthrow Nasser.”

Qutb became the Brotherhood's most influential thinker. He argued that Muslim society was no longer Islamic and must be transformed by an Islamic vanguard through violent revolution. To restore Islam from modern jahiliyya, Muslim states must be overthrown. While Qutb's ideology became very popular elsewhere, in Egypt the Brotherhood's leadership distanced itself from his revolutionary ideology, adhering instead to a nonviolent reformist strategy, to which it has remained ever since.

Nasser's successor, Anwar Sadat, became president of Egypt in 1970 and gradually released imprisoned Brothers and enlisted their help against leftist groups. The organisation was tolerated to an extent, but remained technically illegal and subject to periodic crackdowns. Eventually the Brotherhood was key in the assassination of Anwar Sadat.

In the 1970s, a large student Islamic activist movement took shape, independently from the Brotherhood. Sadat himself became the enemy of the Brotherhood and other Islamist groups after signing a peace agreement with Israel in 1979, and was assassinated by a violent Islamist group Tanzim al-Jihad on October 6, 1981.

=== 1982–2005 ===
In the 1980s, during Hosni Mubarak's presidency, many of the student Islamist activists joined the Brotherhood. The Brotherhood dominated the professional and student associations of Egypt and was famous for its network of social services in neighborhoods and villages. In order to quell the Brotherhood's renewed influence, the government again resorted to repressive measures starting in 1992. Despite mass arrests, police harassment and an essentially closed political system, Brotherhood candidates have made strong showings in several parliamentary elections.

Over the next ten years the Brotherhood made repeated calls for a more democratic political system. In 1997 Muslim Brotherhood Supreme Guide Mustafa Mashhur told journalist Khalid Daoud that he thought Egypt's Coptic Christians and Orthodox Jews should pay the long-abandoned jizya poll tax, levied on non-Muslims in exchange for protection from the state, rationalized by the fact that non-Muslims are exempt from military service while it is compulsory for Muslims. He went on to say, "we do not mind having Christians members in the People's Assembly...the top officials, especially in the army, should be Muslims since we are a Muslim country ... This is necessary because when a Christian country attacks the Muslim country and the army has Christian elements, they can facilitate our defeat by the enemy." According to The Guardian newspaper, the proposal caused an "uproar" among Egypt's six million Coptic Christians and "the movement later backtracked."

In 2000, 15 MB deputies were elected to the Egyptian parliament. A book detailing the record of the MB deputies in the 2000-2005 Egyptian parliament (The Brothers in the 2000-2005 Parliament) found its parliamentary leader Hamdy Hassan working vigorously to fight cultural expression the Brotherhood felt was unIslamic and blasphemous, from literature to beauty contests. Hassan accused the Minister of Culture (Farouk Hosny) of leading what Hassan called the `current US-led war against Islamic culture and identity`. Another Brotherhood MP (Gamal Heshmat) took credit for forcing culture minister Hosni to ban the publication of three novels on the ground they promoted blasphemy and unacceptable sexual practices.

=== 2005–2010 ===
In 2005, the Brotherhood participated in pro-democracy demonstrations with the Kifaya movement. In the 2005 parliamentary elections, the Brotherhood's candidates could only stand as independents under the emergency law, but identified themselves by campaigning under the most famous of their slogans - 'Islam Is the Solution'. They won 88 seats (20% of the total) to form the largest opposition bloc despite many violations of the electoral process. Meanwhile, the legally approved opposition parties won only 14 seats.

More than 1,000 Brothers were arrested before the vote's second and third rounds, and police blocked Brotherhood supporters from entering the polls in some districts, according to independent organizations monitoring the election. Brotherhood leaders also accused the government of changing the final count to lead to a victory for the ruling party candidate in seven districts, a concern echoed by independent monitors. More than 100 Egyptian judges signed a statement condemning "aggression and acts of thuggery by supporters of the ruling party against the judges while...police forces stood idle.

During and after the election the Brethren launched what some have called a "charm offensive." Its leadership talked about its `responsibility to lead reform and change in Egypt.` It addressed the `Coptic issue` stating that `conditions` for Coptic Christians (Copts) would be better `under the Brotherhood group`, and Copts would be "full citizens, not ahl-dhimma," and insinuated that the Brethren would do away with Egypt's decade's old church building-permit system that Coptic Christians felt was discriminatory. Internationally the Brethren launched an English-language website and some of the MB's leaders participated in an Initiative to `Re-Introduc[e] the Brotherhood to the West `, "listing and addressing many `Western misconceptions about the Brotherhood.`" An article was written for The Guardian newspaper under the title `No need to be afraid of us`; and another for American Jewish newspaper The Forward.

This campaign, however, was a direct threat to the Egyptian government and its position as an indispensable ally of the west in its fight against radical Islamist ideologues "bent on the Islamization of society and permanent conflict with the West." The government responded by not only continuing to arrest the Brotherhood's leaders and squeeze its finances, but introduced an amendment of Article 1 of the Egyptian constitution. The amendment would ("in theory") have had the effect of "allowing women, and Christians, to run for any position, including the presidency," by defining Egypt as `a state of citizenship` and remove the reference to Islam as `the religion of the state.` When challenged to vote for the new version of the article, the Brotherhood's members of parliament walked out of the legislative chamber.

The party has also reportedly been weakened by "missteps" that have alienated "many Egyptians" and reportedly played into the government's hands. In December 2006 masked Brotherhood students at Cairo's Al Azhar University staged a militia-style march, which included the "wearing of uniforms, displaying the phrase, 'We Will be Steadfast', and drills involving martial arts. This betrayed the group's intent to plan for the creation of militia structures, and a return by the group to the era of 'secret cells'", according to journalist Jameel Theyabi. Others agreed it was reminiscent of the group's violent past and public outcry ensued.

According to one observer: "after a number of conciliatory engagements and interactions with the West", the Brotherhood,

retreated into its comfort zone of inflammatory rhetoric intended for local consumption: all suicide bombers are `martyrs`; `Israel` regularly became the Jews`; even its theological discourse became more confrontational and oriented to social conservatism.

Two years later the Egyptian government amended the constitution, prohibiting independent candidates from running for Parliament, these being the only candidates the Brotherhood could field. It also arrested thousands of its members, many of whom were tried in military courts. The state delayed local council elections from 2006 to 2008, disqualifying most MB candidates. The MB boycotted the election. The government incarcerated thousands of rank-and-file MB members in a wave of arrests and military trials, the harshest such security clampdown on the Brotherhood "in decades."

All but one of the Brotherhood candidates lost their seats in the 2010 election marred by massive arrests of Brethren and polling place observers. The reaction of a Muslim Brotherhood spokesman to the election was: "We lost seats and a much deserved representation in the parliament. But we won people's love and support and a media battle that exposed [irregularities in] the elections."

=== 2011 Revolution and Morsi Presidency ===
Following the Egyptian Revolution of 2011 that overthrew Hosni Mubarak, the Brotherhood was legalized and emerged as "the most powerful group" and the "most cohesive political movement" in Egypt with "an unparalleled ability to mobilize its followers". Its newly formed political party—the Freedom and Justice Party—won almost half the seats in the 2011–12 parliamentary election (far more than any other party), and its presidential candidate Mohammed Morsi won the 2012 presidential election. However within a year there were mass protests against his rule and he was overthrown by the military.

In the January–February 2011 uprising itself, the Brotherhood remained "on the sidelines", despite having much to gain from a freer political environment, and the breaking off of some activist splinter groups from the Brotherhood. (Sources in the Brotherhood maintain state security forces threatened to arrest supreme guide Mohammed Badie if any Brethren participated.)

On 30 April 2011, it launched a new party called the Freedom and Justice Party. The party rejected "the candidacy of women or Copts for Egypt's presidency", although it did not oppose their taking cabinet positions. The party won 235 (including 22 allies) out of 498 seats in the 2011–12 Egyptian parliamentary election, almost double the next biggest vote-getting party.

In the first couple of years after the revolution, there was both cooperation and tension between the Brotherhood and (secular oriented) military. The Brotherhood supported the constitutional referendum in March which was also supported by the Egyptian army and opposed by Egyptian liberals, causing some Egyptians to speculate about deal between the military and the MB. The Brotherhood has denied reports of secret meetings with the ruling SCAF as "pure lies and imagination." There was further criticism of the military after Brotherhood silence in the midst of violent clashes between revolutionaries and the military in late 2011. The refusal of the Muslim Brotherhood to join protests against military rule is said to have stopped the "second revolution". With regard to the continuance of thousands of secretive military trials, Human Rights Watch criticised the Brotherhood and other Islamists for only noticing what happened to their fellow Islamists, "and not to the thousands of civilians standing military trial or sent to military jails". Egyptian author Ezzedine C. Fishere wrote:

The Brotherhood, led by the old and the hardliners, has managed to alienate its revolutionary and democratic partners and to scare important segments of society, especially women and Christians. Neither the Brotherhood nor the generals showed willingness to share power and both were keen on marginalising the revolutionary and democratic forces. It is as if they were clearing the stage for their eventual showdown.

In mid-June 2012, the SCAF dissolved the parliament dominated by the Brotherhood and other Islamists.

Despite earlier remarks by Supreme Guide Mohammed Badie that the Brotherhood would not "field a candidate for presidency" as victory and the position of a member of the Brotherhood "at the helm of power" might give a foreign power (Israel or the US) a pretext to attack Egypt, a former high level Brotherhood official ran for president in 2012 presidential election. Mohammed Morsi defeated Ahmed Shafiq, a former military officer and prime minister of Mubarak, in the run off. Not waiting for the official result, the Brotherhood declared their candidate the victor and filled Tahrir Square with demonstrators both in opposition to broad powers issued by the military that preclude the latter's subordination to a civilian government, and in fear that SCAF would announce Shafiq the winner of the election and new president. Tensions abated when Morsi was officially declared the election winner on 24 June.

During the one year Morsi served as president serious public opposition developed within months. In late November 2012 Morsi 'temporarily' granted himself unlimited powers on the ground that he would "protect" the nation from the power structure left over from the Mubarak-era and the power to legislate without judicial oversight or review of his acts. He also put a draft constitution to a referendum that opponents complained was "an Islamist coup." These issues brought hundreds of thousands of protesters to the streets in the 2012 Egyptian protests.

Other complaints included the prosecutions of journalists, the unleashing of pro-Brotherhood gangs on nonviolent demonstrators; the continuation of military trials; and new laws that permitted detention without judicial review for up to 30 days, According to the Egyptian Initiative for Personal Rights (EIPR), an independent organization, under Morsi "the Muslim Brotherhood is laying the foundations for a new police state by exceeding the Mubarak regime's mechanisms to suppress civil society." Persecution of minorities by Islamic radicals was ignored by Morsi. Two cases being the April 2013 firing on a funeral of Coptic Christians who had themselves been killed in sectarian attacks in the days before, and the June 2013 lynching in public view of four Shiites by (Sunni) Islamists

By April 2013, according to the Associated Press,

Egypt has become increasingly divided between two camps, with President Mohammed Morsi and Islamist allies on one side and an opposition made up of moderate Muslims, Christians and liberals on the other, a schism essentially over the country's political future after decades of dictatorship. Opponents accuse Morsi and the Muslim Brotherhood of seeking to monopolize power, while Morsi's allies say the opposition is trying to destabilize the country to derail the elected leadership.

Adding to the unrest were severe fuel shortages and electricity outages—which evidence suggests were orchestrated by Mubarak-era Egyptian elites.

In late April, the Tamarod (rebellion) movement was founded to campaign to collect signatures calling for Morsi to step down. On 29 June, it announced it had collected more than 22 million signatures. A day later somewhere between 17 and 33 million Egyptian protesters demonstrated across Egypt urging Morsi to step down A lesser number demonstrated in support of him.

=== 2013 Egyptian removal of Morsi ===
On 3 July, the head of the Egyptian Armed Forces, General Abdel Fattah el-Sisi, announced President Mohamed Morsi removal from power, suspension of the constitution, and new presidential and Shura Council elections. The crackdown that followed has been called more damaging to the Brotherhood's "core organization" than any "in eight decades".

On 14 August, the government declared a month-long state of emergency beginning at 16:00, and the military commenced raids to remove camps of Brotherhood supporters from sit-ins being held throughout the country. Violence escalated rapidly lasting several days and led to the deaths of 638 people—595 civilians and 43 police officers. Some 4000 were injured. In retaliation Brotherhood supporters looted and burned police stations and dozens of churches. By 19 August, al Jazeera reported that "most" of the Brotherhood's leaders were in custody. On that day Supreme Leader (Mohammed Badie) was arrested, crossing a "red line", as even Hosni Mubarak had never arrested him. Other high-profile members of the Brotherhood (including Khairat El-Shater, and Saad al-Katatni) were arrested or ordered arrested.

On 23 September, a court ordered the group outlawed and its assets seized. Two days later security forces shuttered the main office of the newspaper of the Freedom and Justice Party, and confiscated its equipment.

=== As of 2025 ===
As of early 2024, the movement was reportedly afflicted with both internal disputes and continued government repression. Its Supreme Guide, Mohamed Badie, his two deputies, Khairat Al-Shater and Mahmoud Ezzat, and thousands of cadres, parliamentary deputies and prominent members throughout Egypt had been arrested following the overthrow of Morsi and remained in prison.

The Turkish government had offered the Brotherhood "refuge and a platform" following its repression in Egypt, but in 2022 began "scaling back" support for the group to repair relations with Arab countries as Turkey was suffering from an economic downturn. In July 2025, a leader of the Brotherhood, Mohamed Abdel Hafiz, was arrested in Turkey, allegedly for his part in planning/organizing terrorist plots in Egypt.

== General leaders ==
Supreme guides or General leaders (G.L.) of the Muslim Brotherhood in Egypt have been:

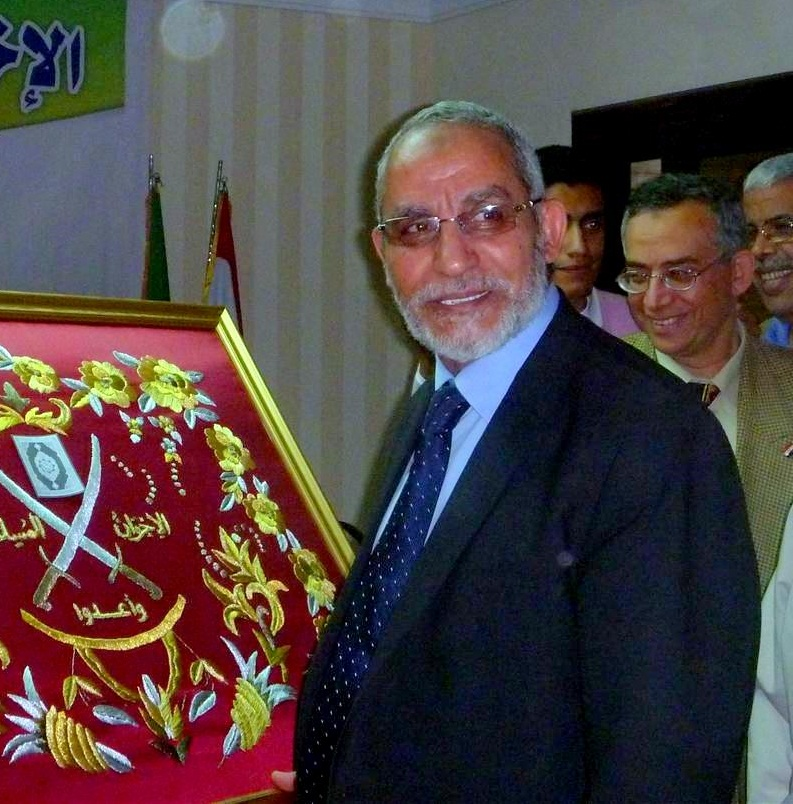
Mohammed Badie, the current leader

- Founder and first General Leader (G.L.): (1928–1949) Hassan al-Banna حسن البنا
- 2nd G.L.: (1949–1972) Hassan al-Hudaybi حسن الهضيبي
- 3rd G.L.: (1972–1986) Umar al-Tilmisani عمر التلمساني
- 4th G.L.: (1986–1996) Muhammad Hamid Abu al-Nasr محمد حامد أبو النصر
- 5th G.L.: (1996–2002) Mustafa Mashhur مصطفى مشهور
- 6th G.L.: (2002–2004) Ma'mun al-Hudaybi مأمون الهضيبي
- 7th G.L.: (2004–2010) Mohammed Mahdi Akef محمد مهدي عاكف
- 8th G.L.: (16 January 2010) Mohammed Badie محمد بديع

== See also ==
- Muslim Brotherhood in Egypt
