= Manial Palace and Museum =

Manial Palace
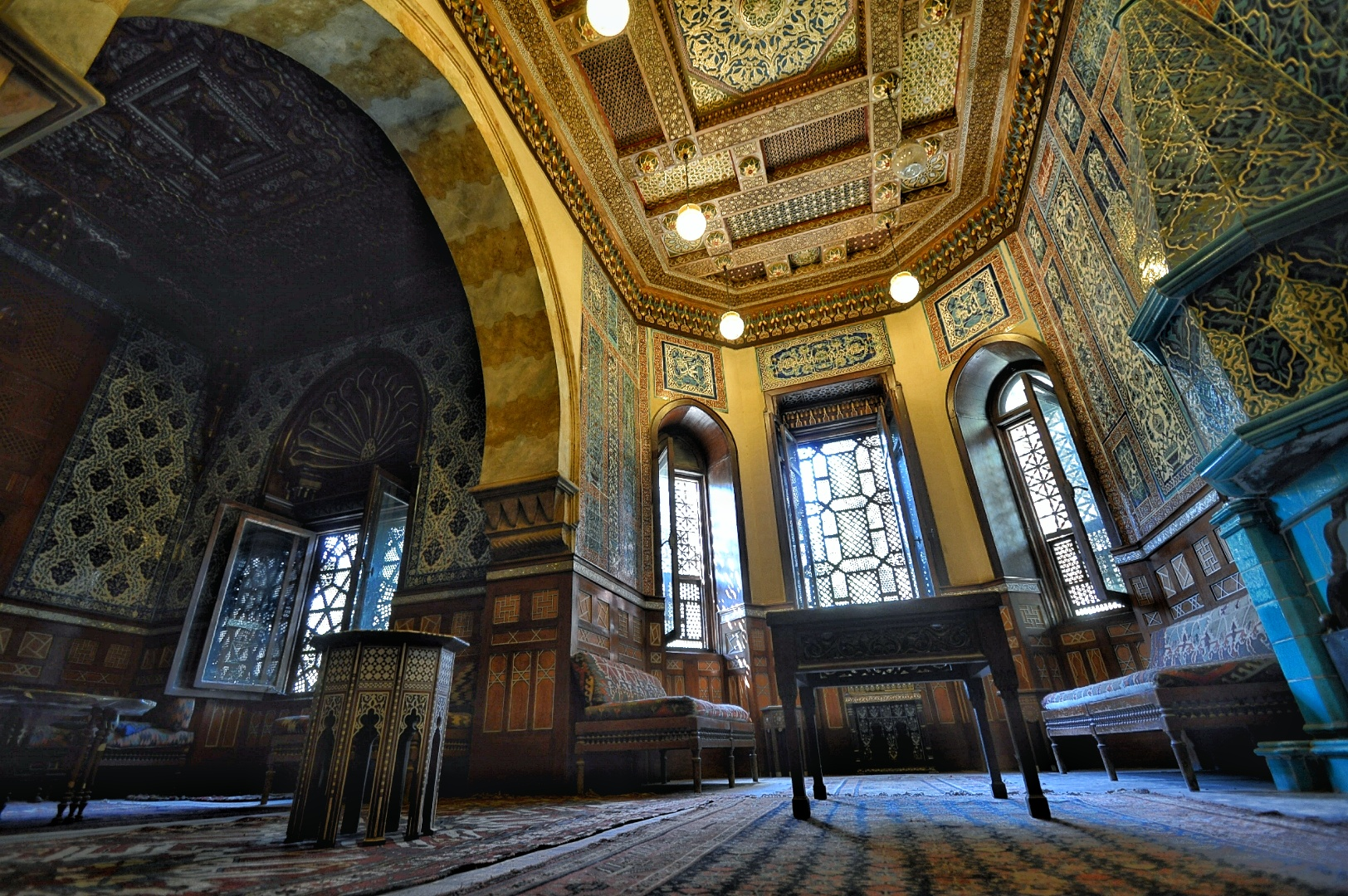

- Location within Egypt

General information
- Architectural style: Arabic, Ottoman, Moorish
- Location: Manial; Cairo, Egypt
- Coordinates: 30°01′39″N 31°13′47″E
- Construction started: 1875
- Client: Mohammed Ali Tewfik

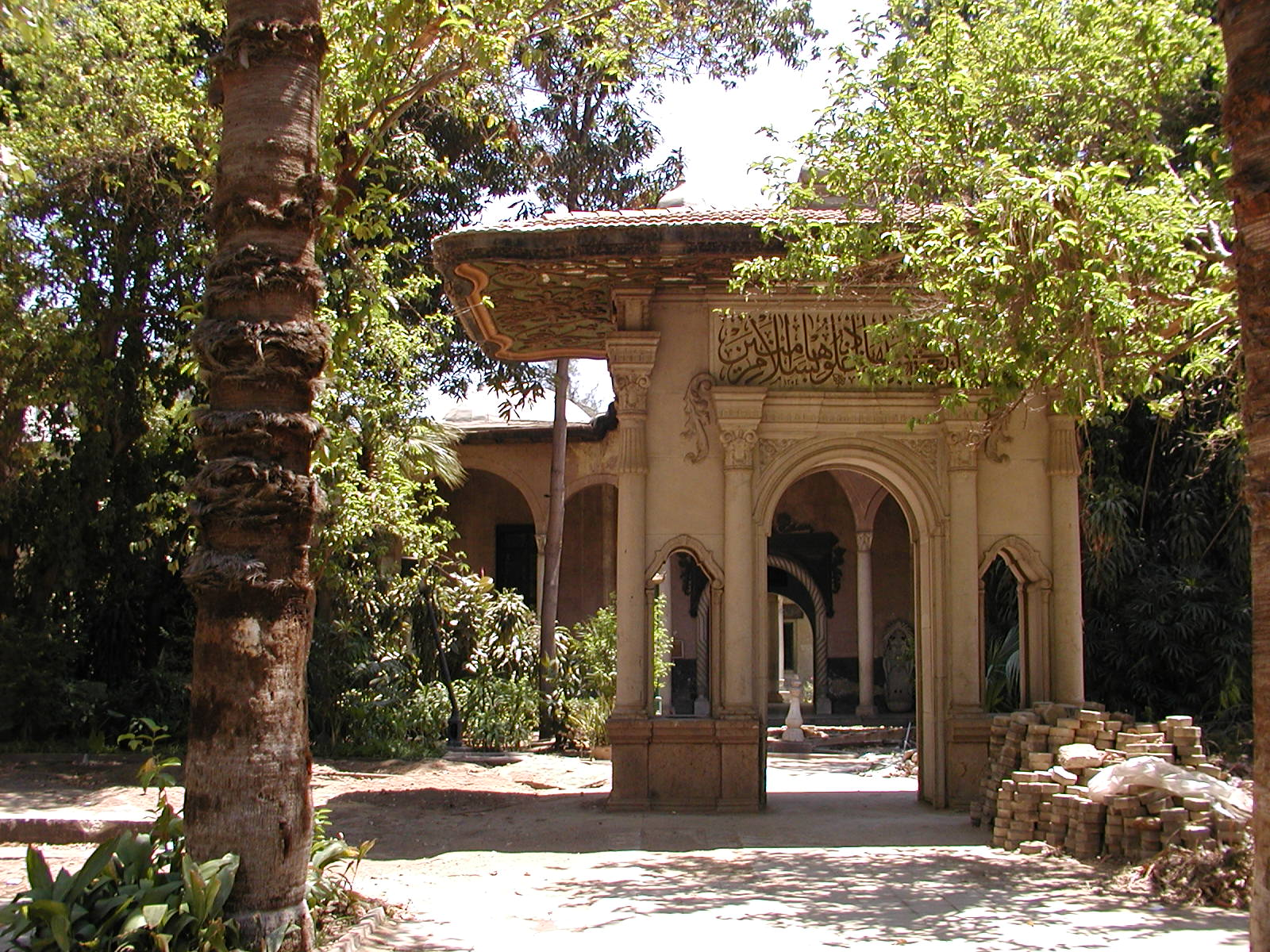
Manial Palace, entry porte-cochère and gardens.

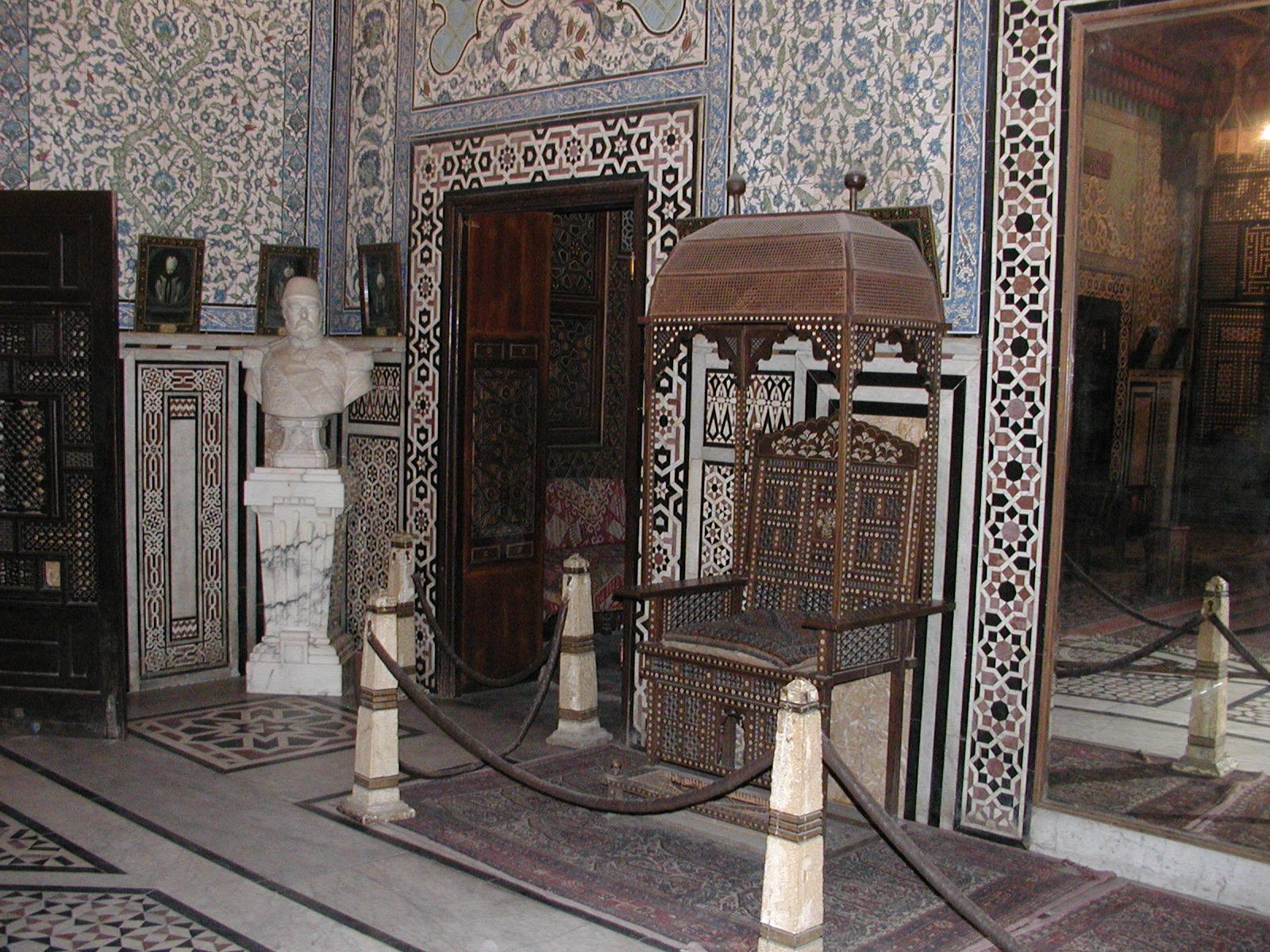
Manial Palace, the throne room of Mohammed Ali Tewfik.

The Manial Palace and Museum is a former Alawiyya dynasty era palace and grounds on Rhoda Island on the Nile. It is of Ottoman architecture and located in the Sharia Al-Saray area in the El-Manial district of southern Cairo, Egypt. The palace and estate has been preserved as an Antiquities Council directed historic house museum and estate, reflecting the settings and lifestyle of the late 19th- and early 20th-century Egyptian royal prince and heir apparent. The residence compound, composed of five separate and distinctively styled buildings, is surrounded by Persian gardens within an extensive English Landscape garden estate park, along a small branch of the Nile.

The palace featuring a blend of various Islamic art styles, including Fatimid, Mamluk, Ottoman, Andalusian, Persian, and Levantine influences. It comprises three main structures: the Residence Palace, the Reception Palace, and the Throne Palace. Additionally, the complex includes a mosque, a private museum, a hunting museum, and a clock tower, all enclosed by a wall resembling the fortified walls of medieval castles. Inside, the palaces are surrounded by gardens that host a rare collection of trees and plants. Today, the palace serves as a museum.

The palace originally belonged to Prince Mohamed Ali, the second son of Tewfik Pasha and the brother of Khedive Abbas II . Prince Mohamed Ali held the position of crown prince three times and was one of the three regents during the period between the death of King Fuad I and the ascension of King Farouk to the throne upon reaching the legal age.

Prince Mohamed Ali personally selected the location of the palace, beginning with the construction of the Residence Palace, followed by the other structures. He oversaw the design and decoration processes, while the construction work was carried out by Mohamed Afifi, a master builder. The prince left instructions for the palace to be converted into a museum after his death.

== Biography ==
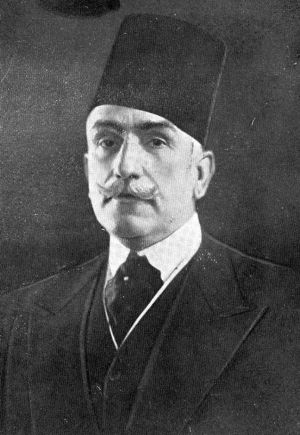
Prince Muhammad Ali

Prince Mohamed Ali was the second son of Khedive Tewfik, grandson of Khedive Ismail, and son of Princess Amina Najiba Ilhami, daughter of Ibrahim Ilhami Pasha and granddaughter of Abbas I. His siblings included Khedive Abbas Hilmi II, Princess Nazli Hanim, Princess Khadija Hanim, and Princess Neamatallah. Born on November 9, 1875 (11 Shawwal 1292 AH) in Cairo, Prince Mohamed Ali showed an early passion for knowledge. He began his education at the Aliyah School in Abdeen, where he completed his primary studies.

In 1884, he traveled to Europe for advanced education, attending Hexous School in Switzerland, and later, upon his father’s orders, enrolled at Theresianum Military Academy in Austria to study military sciences. Following the death of his father in 1892, he returned to Egypt. As a young man, he was recognized for his wisdom and intellect, with a keen interest in sciences, literature, and particularly Islamic art and culture.

Prince Mohamed Ali served as Crown Prince three times:

1. First Term: During the reign of his brother, Khedive Abbas Hilmi II, until the birth of Abbas’s son, Prince Mohamed Abdel Moneim. Following Khedive Abbas’s deposition, the British authorities required Prince Mohamed Ali to leave Egypt, and he resided in Montreux, Switzerland until Sultan Ahmed Fuad I allowed his return.
2. Second Term: After his return, Sultan Fuad appointed him Crown Prince again until the birth of Prince Farouk.
3. Third Term: Prince Mohamed Ali was one of three regents overseeing the throne between the death of King Fuad I and King Farouk’s assumption of constitutional powers upon reaching legal age. He was reappointed Crown Prince during Farouk’s reign, a position he held until the birth of Prince Ahmed Fouad II.

Prince Mohamed Ali died on March 17, 1954, in Lausanne, Switzerland, at the age of 80. He had expressed a wish to be buried in Egypt, and his remains were interred in the Royal Mausoleum at Qubbat Afandina in the El-Darrasa district of Cairo.

== Construction of the Manial Palace ==
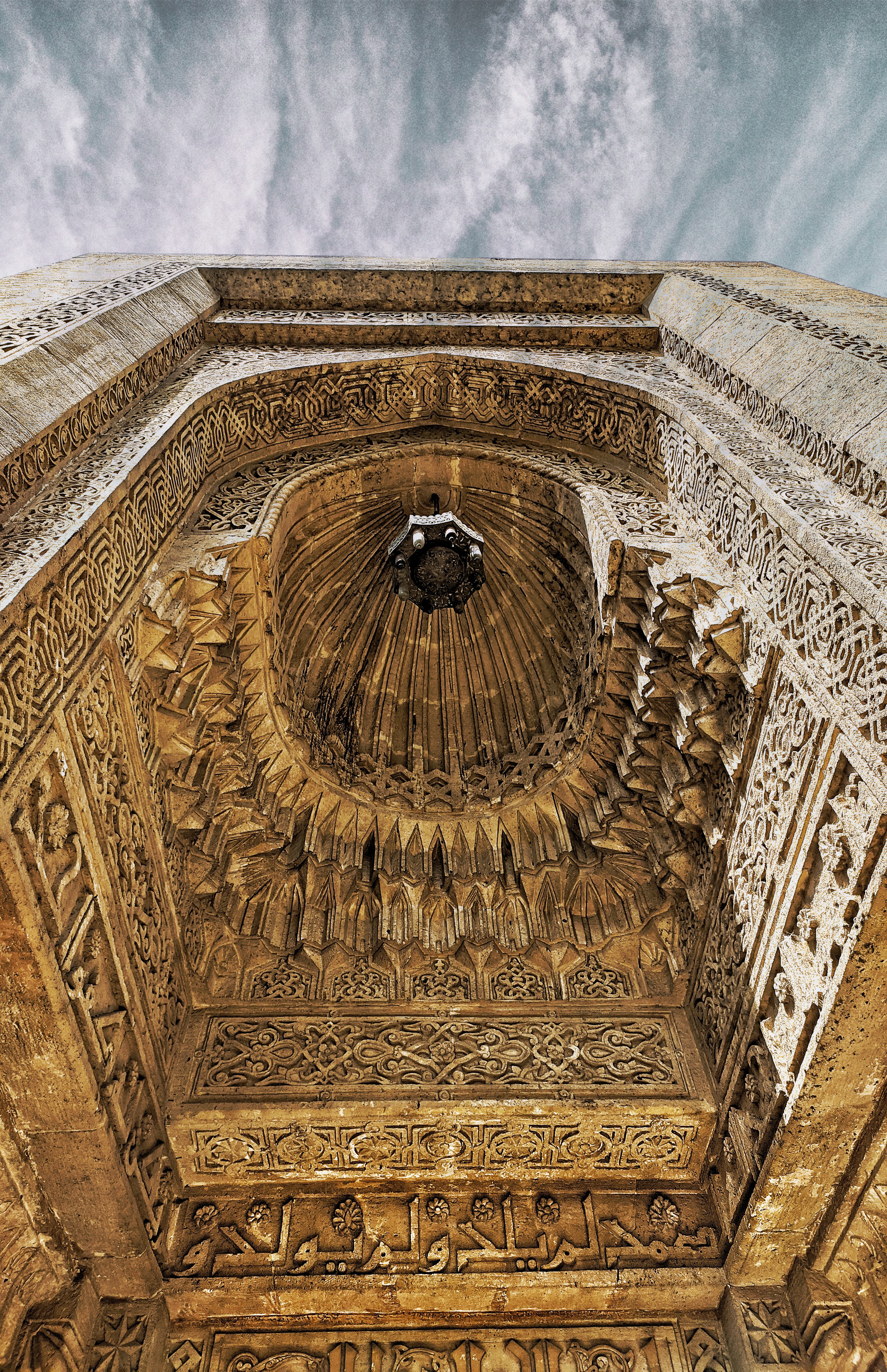
Intricately carved entrance to the Mosque, featuring Muqarnas

Prince Mohamed Ali personally selected the site for his palace, intending it as a residence that would embody his vision for Islamic art and architecture. He began by constructing the Residence Palace (Saray Al-Iqama) and later added the remaining buildings. The prince meticulously designed the architectural and decorative elements of the palace and oversaw every phase of its construction.

The actual execution of the designs was carried out by master builder Mohamed Afifi. This is confirmed by an inscription at the palace entrance, which reads:

"The Manial Palace of Prince Mohamed Ali, built by Prince Mohamed Ali, son of Mohamed Tewfik, to revive and honor Islamic arts. The prince designed the building and its decoration, and its execution was carried out by Mohamed Afifi in the year 1348 AH."

== History ==
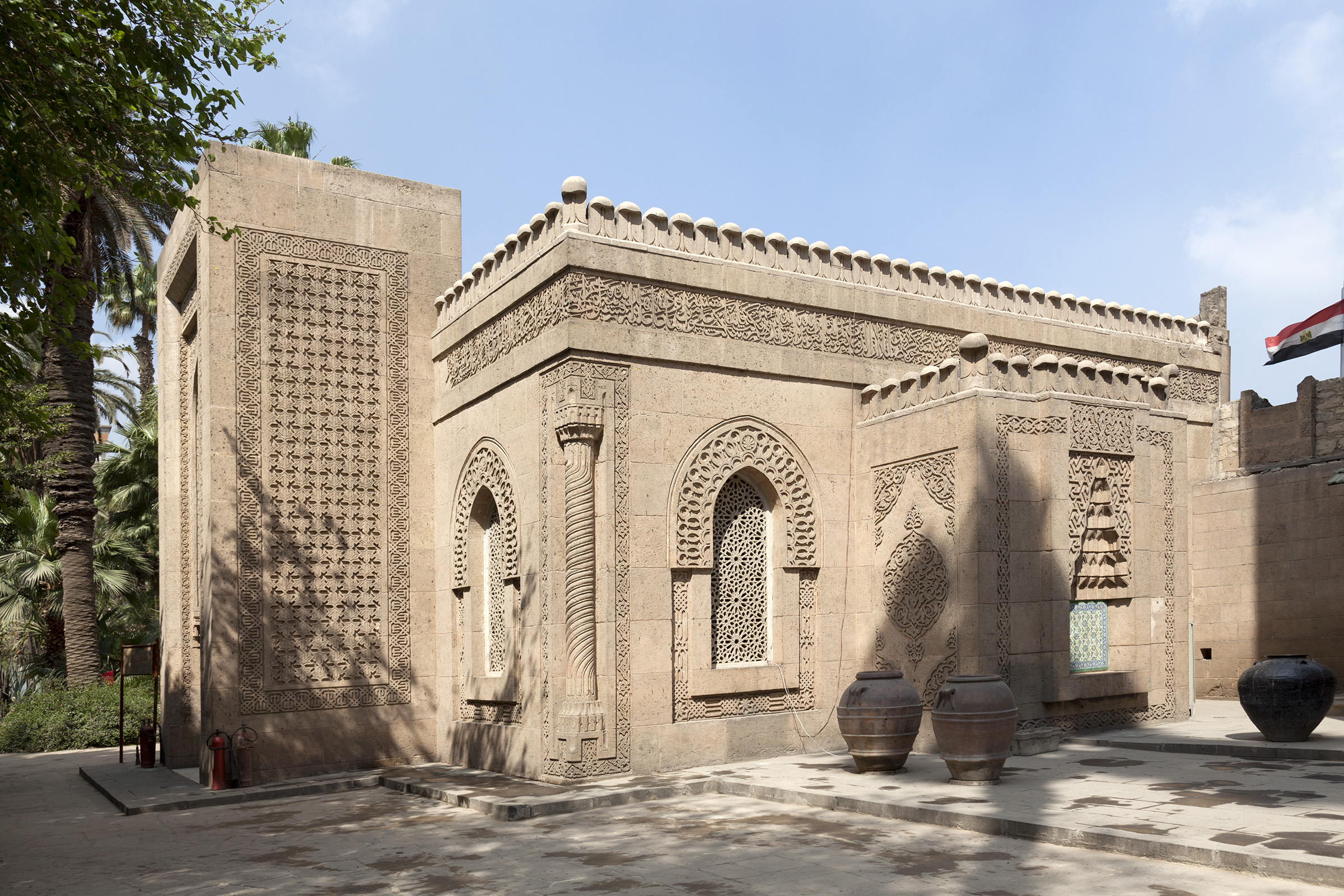
Mosque

The ownership of the land where the Manial Palace stands changed hands several times, passing through various members of the royal family and prominent foreign figures in Egypt. Initially, the land belonged to Prince Mustafa Fadl Pasha and Prince Ahmed Rifaat Pasha, before being transferred to Khedive Ismail. It then came under the ownership of Mr. Louis Marie Joseph and later Duke Edmond. In 1888, Duke Edmond ceded the land to a French resident in Egypt, Jean Claude Arshid. In 1902, Prince Mohamed Ali purchased the property and began construction on the palace in 1901.

During the royal era, Prince Mohamed Ali hosted numerous events and gatherings at the palace, inviting prominent state officials, ministers, aristocrats, intellectuals, and journalists. In his will, he requested that the palace be turned into a museum after his death to allow visitors to enjoy its artistic beauty.

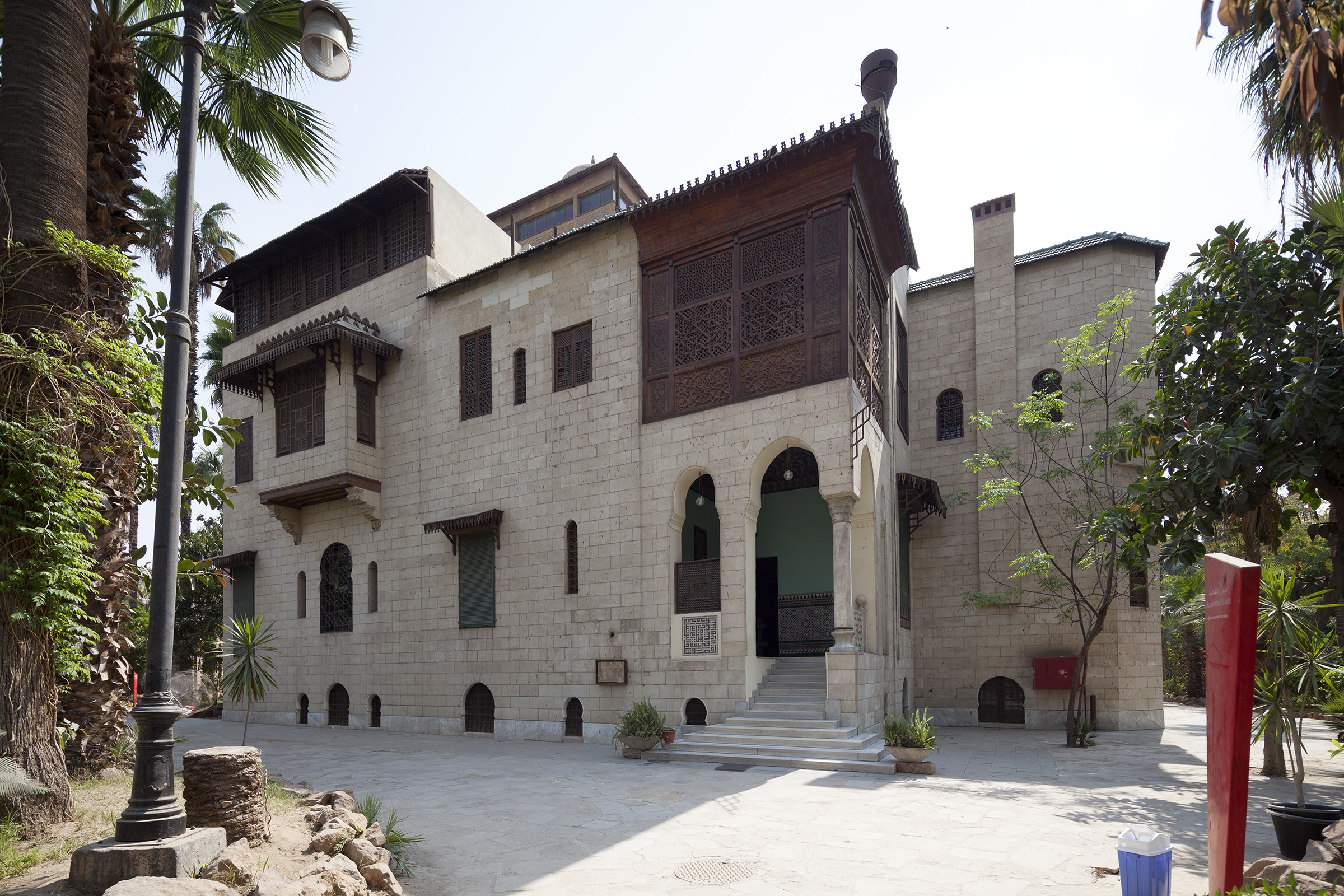
Residence Saray

Following the 1952 Revolution and the nationalization of the assets of the Mohamed Ali family, the palace was entrusted to the Reclaimed Property Administration. In 1964, the administration handed over the palace’s contents to the Egyptian Tourism and Hotels Company, which subsequently built the Manial Palace Hotel in the palace gardens. The hotel consisted of wooden chalet-style buildings with two stories, housing 180 double rooms.

In 1991, following the issuance of Law No. 203 on Public Business Sector, the hotel was incorporated into the holdings of the Holding Company for Housing, Tourism, Hotels, and Cinema. This led to a dispute between the Reclaimed Property Administration and the holding company, which culminated in a decision by the Prime Minister to transfer the palace gardens to the museum's management and demolish the wooden chalets, which had been seen as an eyesore, in order to preserve the palace's beauty.

== Design ==
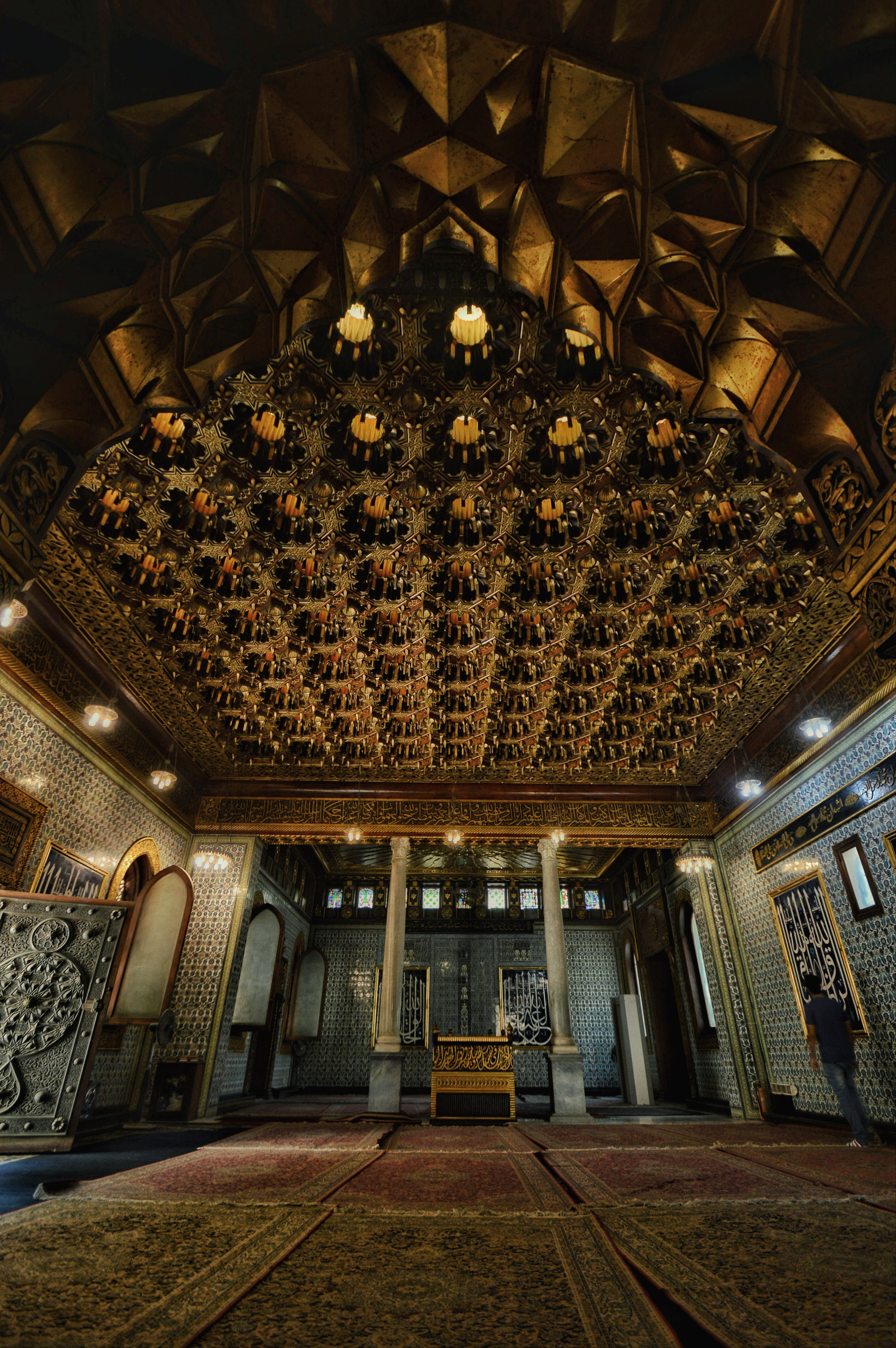
The mosque and mihrab

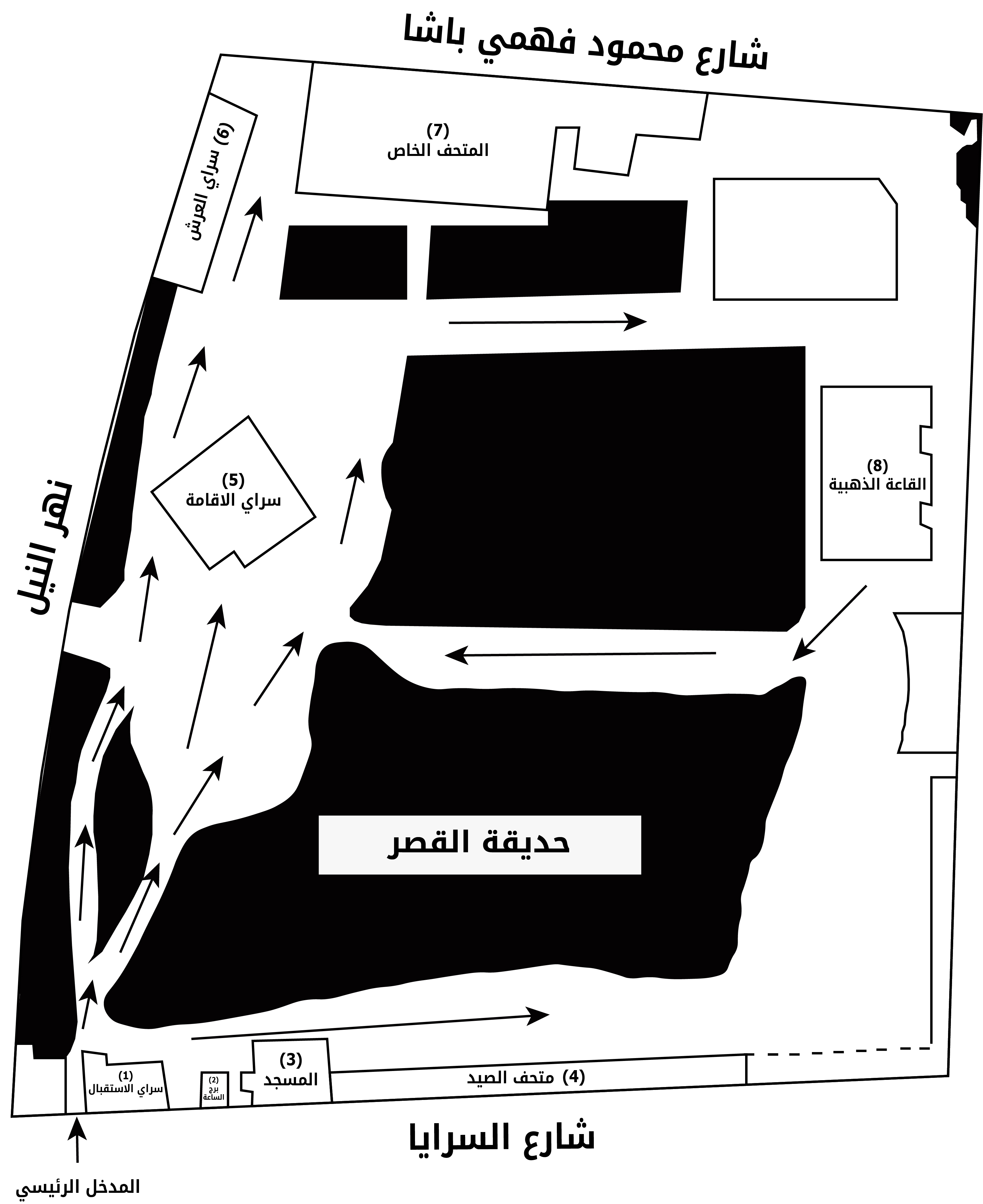
Palace scheme

The Manial Palace is situated in the northern part of Roda Island, overlooking a small branch of the Nile River opposite Qasr El-Aini. The palace covers a total area of approximately 61,711 square meters, with around 5,000 square meters allocated for the buildings, including the various pavilions, while the remaining area is dedicated to gardens and internal pathways.

The palace’s significance lies in its unique architectural style, which incorporates various elements of Islamic art, including Fatimid, Mamluk, Ottoman, Andalusian, Persian, and Syrian influences. It consists of three main pavilions: the Residence Pavilion, the Reception Pavilion, and the Throne Pavilion. Additionally, the complex includes a mosque, a private museum, a hunting museum, and a clock tower. The palace is surrounded by a wall designed in the style of medieval fortress walls.

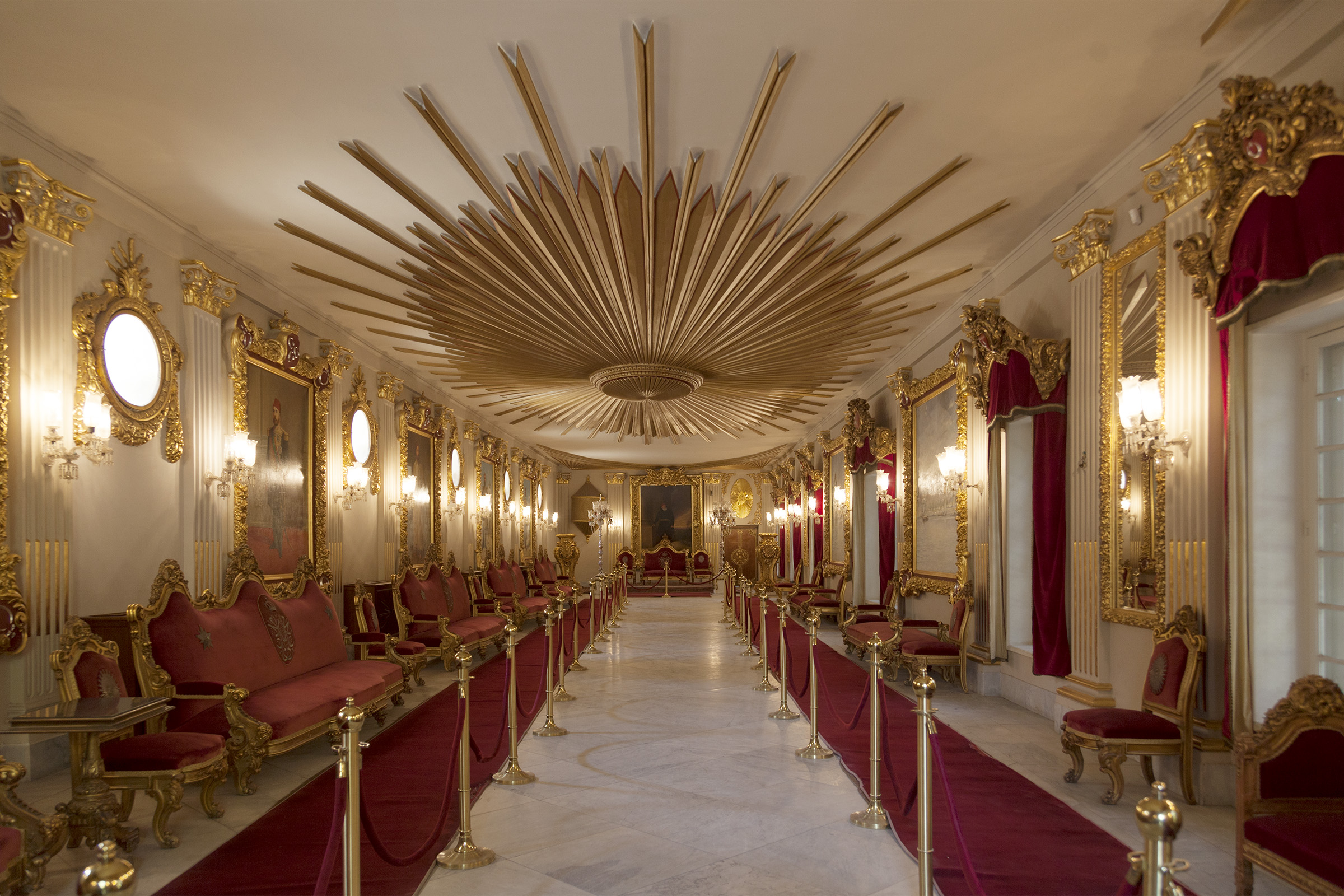
- Throne Pavilion
  Reception Pavilion: The Reception Pavilion was intended to host official guests and dignitaries. It houses a collection of rare artifacts, including ornate carpets, furniture, and intricately decorated Arabic tables. The pavilion consists of two floors:
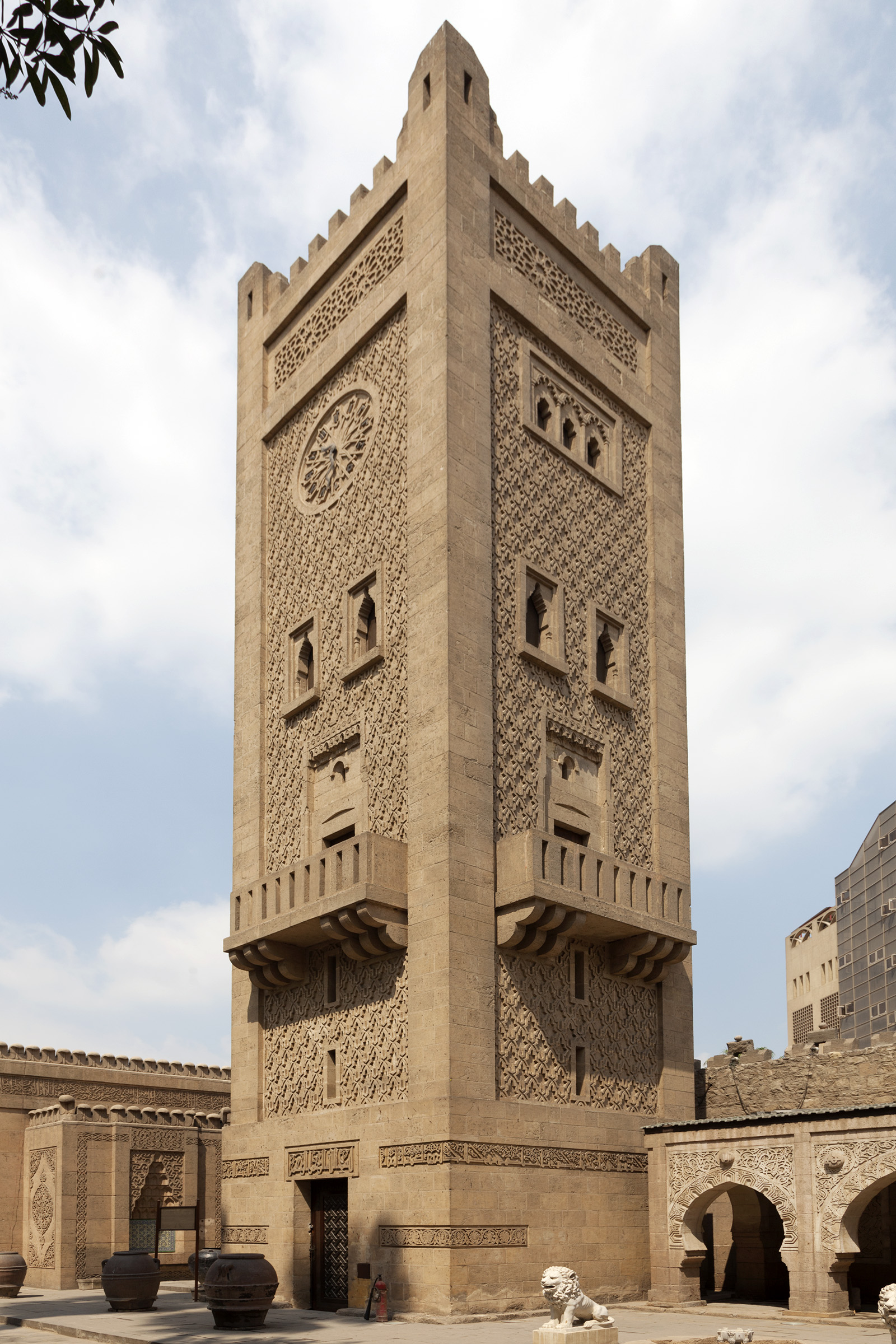
  - Clock tower
    The ground floor includes the Ceremonial Hall, designed for receiving official figures, senior state officials, and ambassadors, as well as a room designated for greeting distinguished worshippers accompanying the prince to the palace mosque.
  - The upper floor features two large halls. One is designed in the Moroccan style, with walls adorned with mirrors and ceramic tiles. The other hall follows the Syrian style, with walls and ceilings covered in intricately decorated wood panels, featuring geometric and floral patterns, as well as Quranic verses and poetic inscriptions.
- Residential Pavilion: The Residential Pavilion is the main and first structure built within the palace complex, serving as the residence of Prince Mohamed Ali. It consists of two floors connected by a finely crafted staircase. The ground floor includes fountain Hall, Harem Room, Shakma (Private Lounge), Mirror Room, Blue Salon Room, Mother-of-Pearl Salon, Dining Room, Fireplace Room and Prince's Office and Library. Each room in the pavilion showcases unique decorative styles and collections of artifacts, including furniture, carpets, paintings, oil portraits, and jewelry. The pavilion is considered a museum of Turkish ceramic tiles, with a variety of intricate designs. Additionally, the pavilion features a tower offering panoramic views of key landmarks in Cairo and Giza.
- Throne Pavilion: Consists of two floors:
  - Ground Floor: Known as the Throne Hall, this expansive room features a gilded wooden set of sofas and chairs upholstered in velvet. The walls are adorned with large portraits of various rulers from the Mohamed Ali Dynasty, alongside paintings of natural landscapes from Cairo and Giza. This hall served as a venue for hosting guests during special occasions, such as religious and national celebrations.
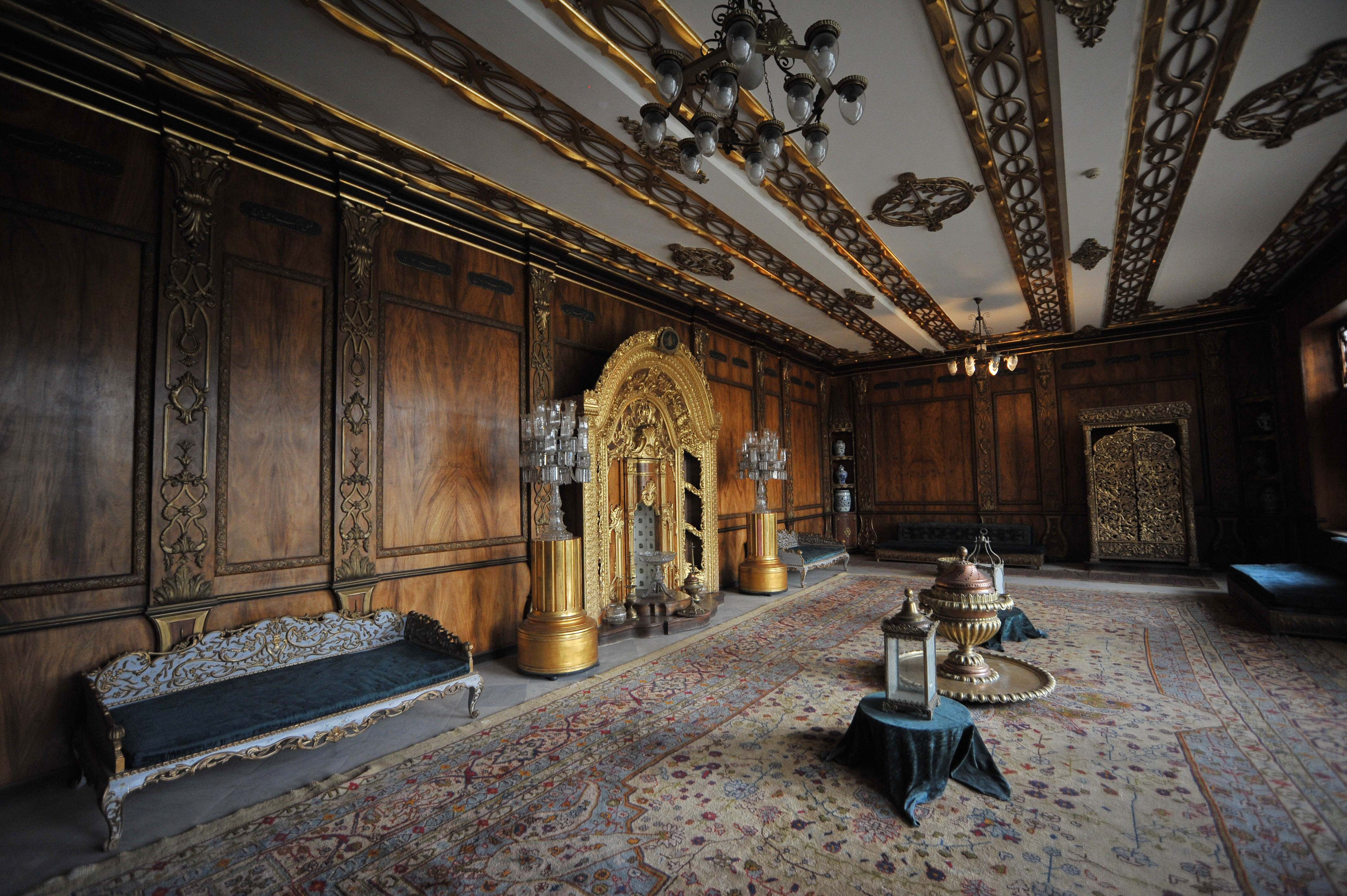
  - Winter Hall, Saray Al-Arch
    Upper Floor: Comprising two winter sitting rooms and a rare room dedicated to the possessions of Ibrahim Ilhami Pasha, the maternal grandfather of Prince Mohamed Ali. This room, referred to as the Aubusson Room, is named after the French Aubusson tapestry that covers all its walls.
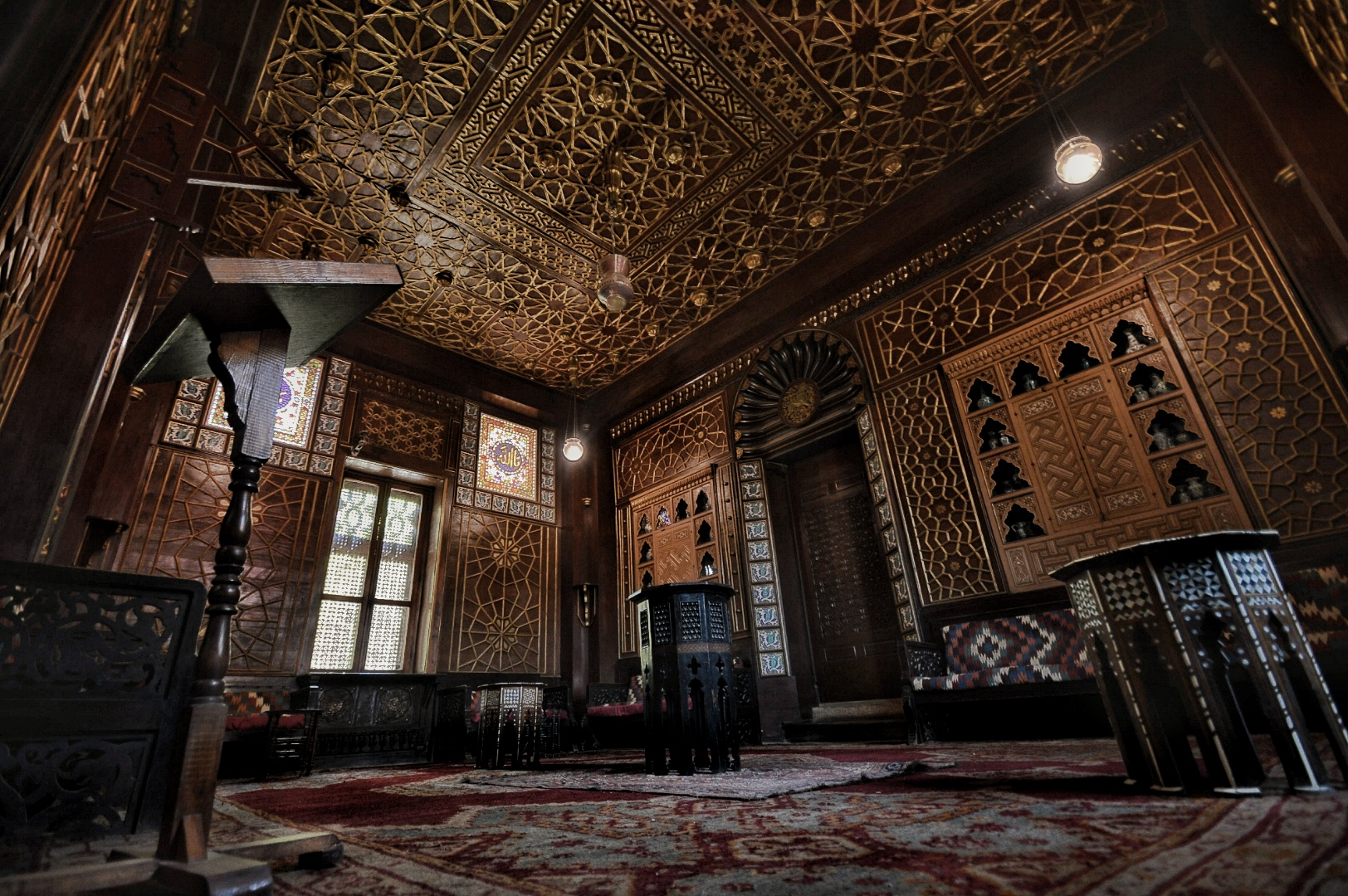
- VIP Reception Room in the Reception Center
  Golden Hall: The Golden Hall, also known as the Salon of Regency, was primarily used for official ceremonies and celebrations. Despite lacking furniture or artifacts, the hall is considered a masterpiece of artistic craftsmanship due to its intricately gilded floral and geometric motifs adorning the walls and ceiling. Prince Mohamed Ali had the hall transferred from the residence of his grandfather, Ibrahim Ilhami Pasha, who originally built it to honor Sultan Abdulmejid I during a visit commemorating Ilhami Pasha's victory over the Russian Empire in the Crimean War. The hall’s name derives from its Ottoman Rococo style decorations, with gold used extensively on its surfaces. The columns, shaped like palm trees, add a subtle Egyptian touch to the overall design.
- The Mosque: The Mosque within the Manial Palace complex was constructed in the Ottoman architectural style and is regarded as one of the most architecturally and artistically distinguished structures in the palace. The mosque consists of two iwans (halls).
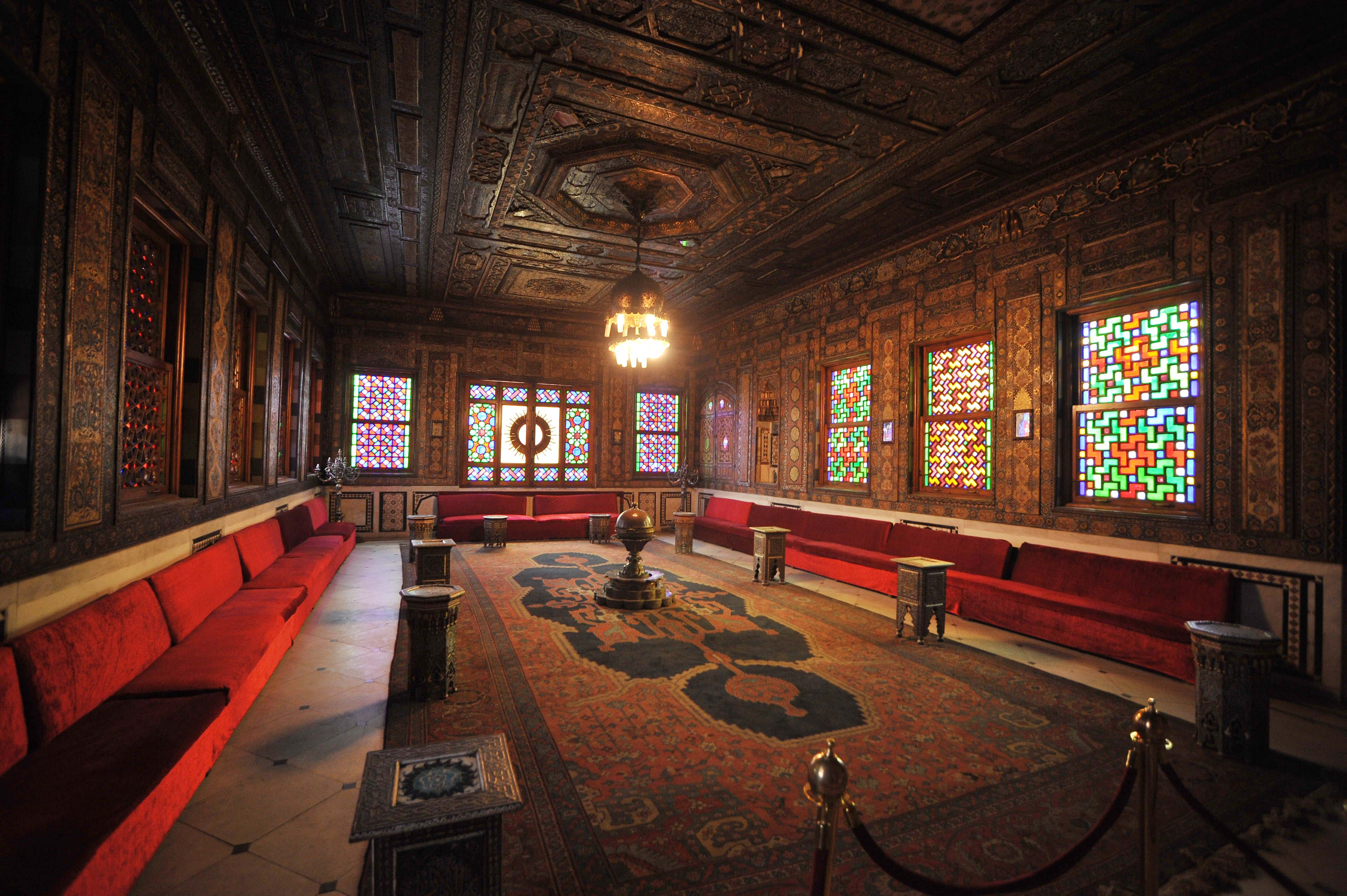
  The Levantine Hall in the Reception Serail
  The eastern iwan features a ceiling designed with small domes made of yellow glass, while the western iwan is adorned with decorations resembling the rays of the sun. The minbar (pulpit) and mihrab (prayer niche) are gilded, enhancing their visual prominence. The walls are covered with Iznik tiles, some of which bear inscriptions.
- The Clock Tower: The Clock Tower was constructed in the style of Andalusian and Moroccan towers, which historically served for observation and as a means of communication through fire signals at night and smoke signals during the day. A large clock was added to the tower. The tower features Kufic inscriptions and houses a clock similar to the one on the façade of Cairo’s Ramses Station, but with a unique distinction: its hands are designed in the shape of snakes.
- The wooden staircase in the residence hall
  The Private Museum: Is located on the southern side of the palace and consists of fifteen halls surrounding a central courtyard with a small garden. The museum houses a collection of rare artifacts, including: Antique carpets, Rare Arabic manuscripts, Oil paintings of members of the Muhammad Ali dynasty, Landscape paintings, Metal and crystal artifacts, including candlestick, Writing instruments, furniture, textiles, and clothing, These collections offer a glimpse into the luxurious lifestyle and artistic heritage of Egypt's royal family.
  - Hall 1: Displays rare manuscripts, Qur'anic commentaries, and calligraphy panels adorned with floral and bird motifs.
  - Hall 2: Features a collection of writing instruments, including pieces made of reed, ivory, and metal, along with scissors and inkwells.
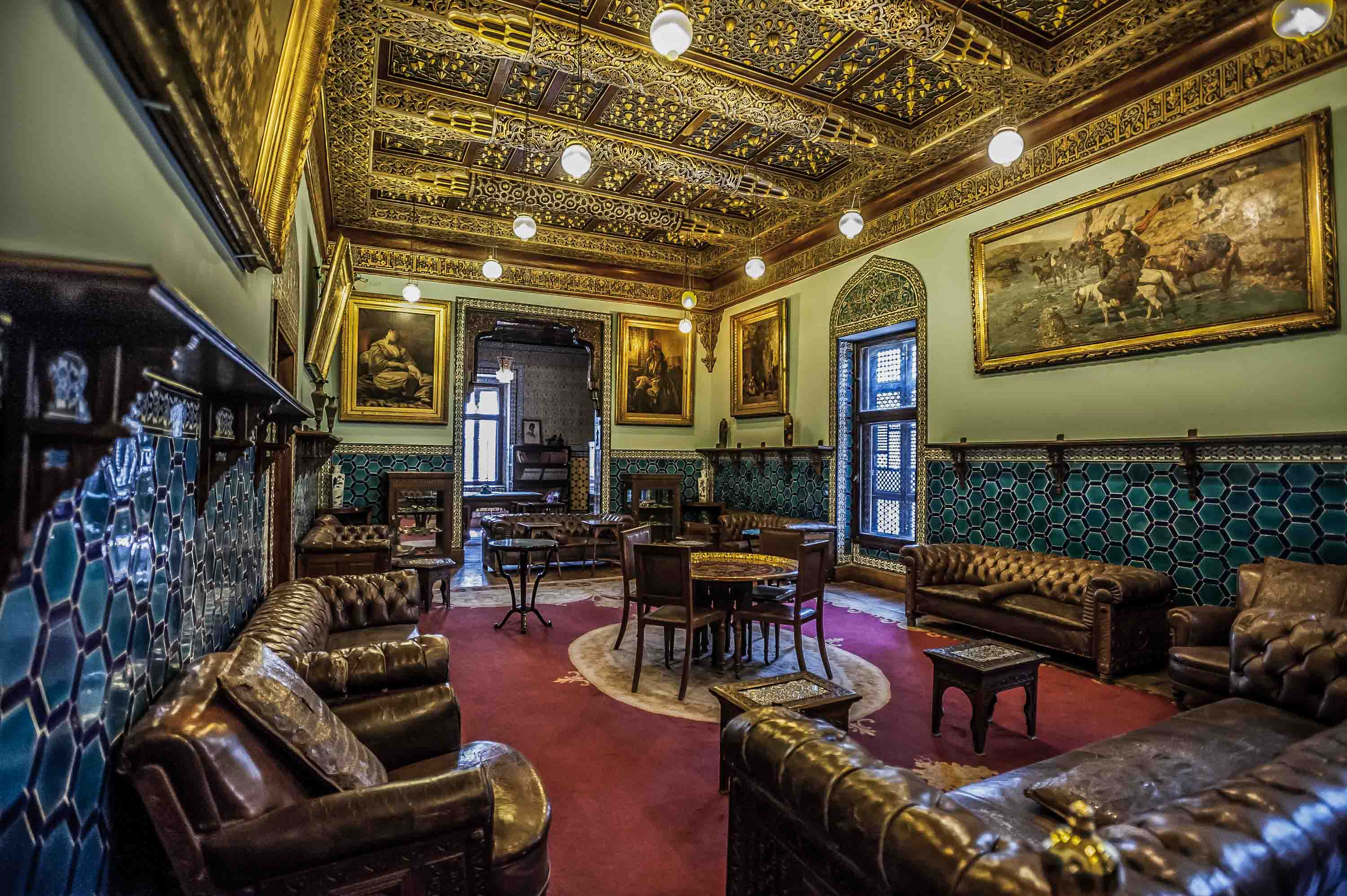
  - Blue Salon at the Residency
    Hall 3: Exhibits silk tablecloths and napkins, along with antique boxes inlaid with mother-of-pearl.
  - Hall 4:Houses an assortment of weapons, including bladed and firearms such as Arabian and Ottoman swords and daggers.
  - Hall 5: The largest hall in the museum, showcasing a collection of rare carpets from various styles and regions.
  - Hall 6: Contains nine display cases featuring teacups, glassware, vases, and pitchers.
  - Hall 7: A small room with a ceiling designed to resemble a carpet. Displays include serma textiles and a carpet shaped like a Turkish lyre.
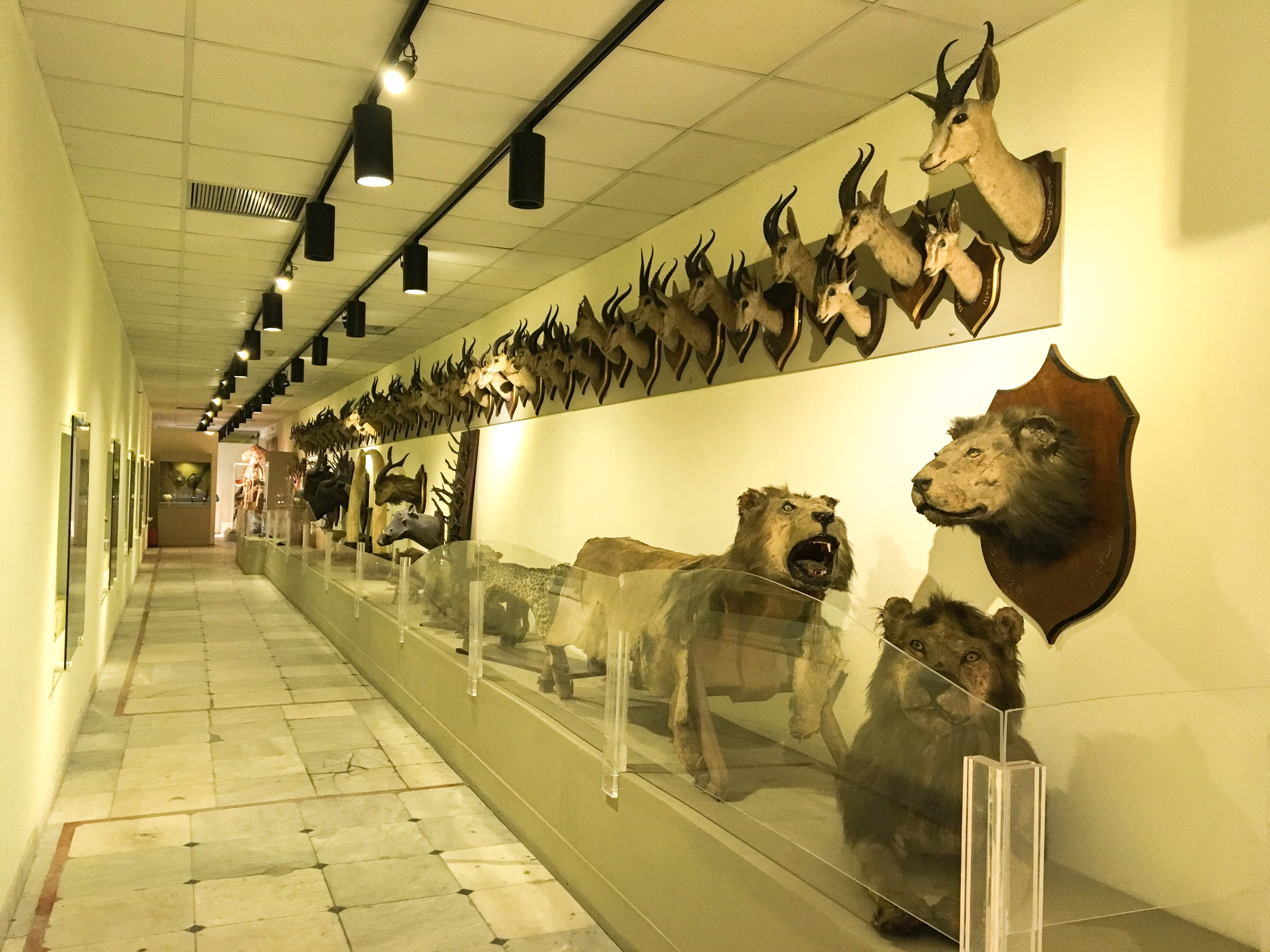
  - Fishing Museum
    Hall 8: Presents traditional Turkish costumes for different social classes and a collection of women’s belts adorned with rubies, coral, and amber.
  - Hall 9: Features a central pyramidal display case containing the prince’s personal items, decorated with diamonds, alongside a selection of gifts from foreign monarchs.
  - Hall 10: Showcases silver-plated artifacts, including vases and candelabras.
  - Hall 11: Contains a large display cabinet of porcelain vessels of various shapes and sizes, along with small-sized carpets.
  - Hall 12: Known as the Summer Hall, its southwestern wall features marble lion heads with water flowing from their mouths. The opposite wall has a stained glass balcony running across its length.
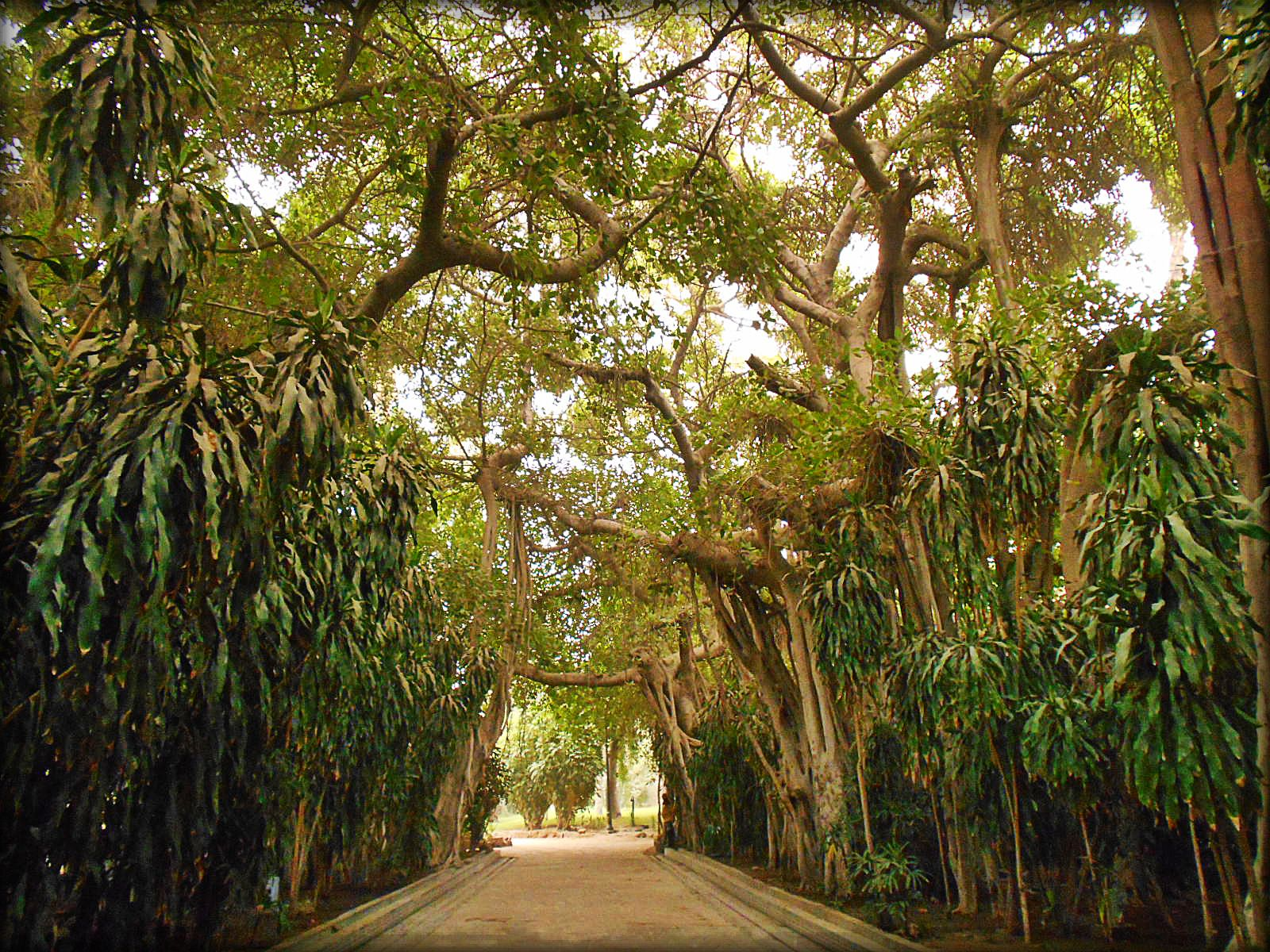
  - Palace Park
    Hall 13: Displays metal artifacts, with the walls adorned by serma textiles.
  - Hall 14: Exhibits porcelain tea and coffee sets decorated with colorful floral patterns.
- The Hunting Museum: The Hunting Museum was added to the palace in 1963, utilizing a long corridor along the northern wall, transforming it into a dedicated space for hunting artifacts. The museum displays a collection of 1,180 specimens of taxidermied animals, birds, and butterflies from the hunting collections of King Farouk, Prince Muhammad Ali, and Prince Yusuf Kamal. Additionally, the museum features the skeletons of a camel and a horse, which were used to carry the Kabah cover during the Mahmal procession, as well as skulls, horns, skins, hunting tools, and paintings.
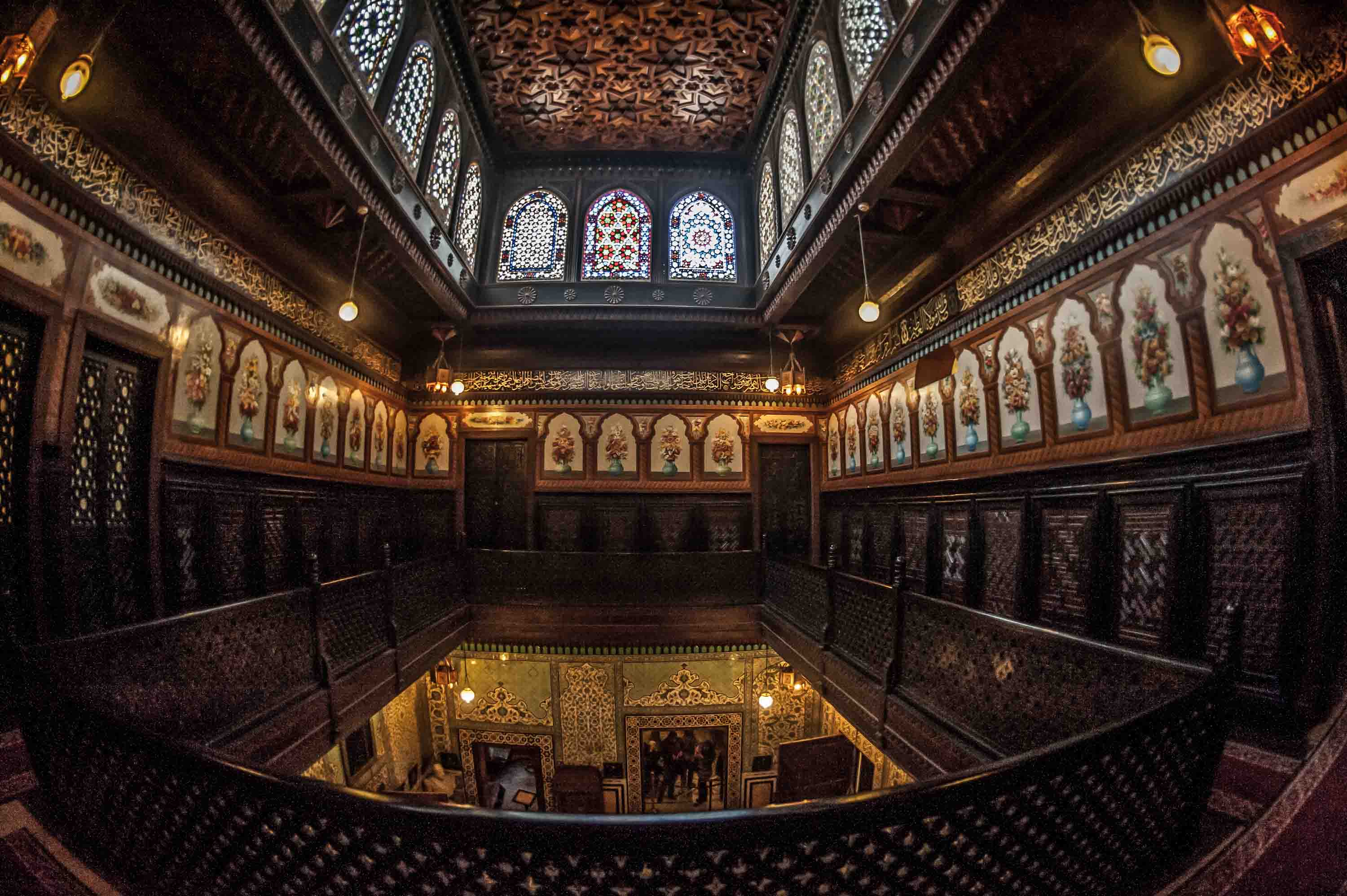
- Residence beds
  The garden: Covers an area of 34,000 square meters and houses a rare collection of trees and plants that Prince Muhammad Ali gathered from various parts of the world. Notable plants include a collection of cacti, Indian fig trees, varieties of palms such as the royal palm with white trunks, bamboo trees, ficus trees, and more.

== Restoration ==
In 2005, the palace was closed for restoration, which lasted for 10 years until its reopening in 2015. The restoration work included comprehensive maintenance of all the palace buildings, including decorations and halls, cleaning the paintings and decorations, and restoring the archaeological collections. Additionally, the project involved reinstalling the historical ceiling of the Throne Hall, which had collapsed due to the passage of time. The project also included the construction of an administrative building, a well-equipped workshop for precise restoration work, a lecture hall, and a space for displaying textiles.

== Currently ==
The palace is currently an open museum showcasing modern Islamic architecture and arts in various styles and decorations. It displays the unique and rare collections of Prince Mohamed Ali. Additionally, the palace’s garden and the Golden Hall are used for hosting events for a fee. The palace also hosts free cultural and educational workshops for school students.

== Location ==
The museum is located in the heart of Cairo, specifically on Manial Island, near Qasr El-Eini. It can be accessed by public transportation, private cars, or the metro, with the nearest station being Sayyida Zeinab, followed by a short walk to the palace. The visiting hours for the palace are from 9:00 AM to 5:00 PM.

=== Ticket prices ===
The value is in Egyptian pounds.

Visitors	Egyptian and Arab students	Egyptians and Arabs	Foreign students	Foreigners
Ticket price	20 EGP	60 EGP	110 EGP	220 EGP

== Management ==
The palace belongs to the Museums Sector of the Supreme Council of Antiquities of the Ministry of Tourism and Antiquities (Egypt), and its affairs are overseen by the museum director, a position that has been held by several figures, including:

- Walaeddin Badawi.
- Mustafa Abdel Halim.
- Aisha Ibrahim.

== Gallery ==
Interior

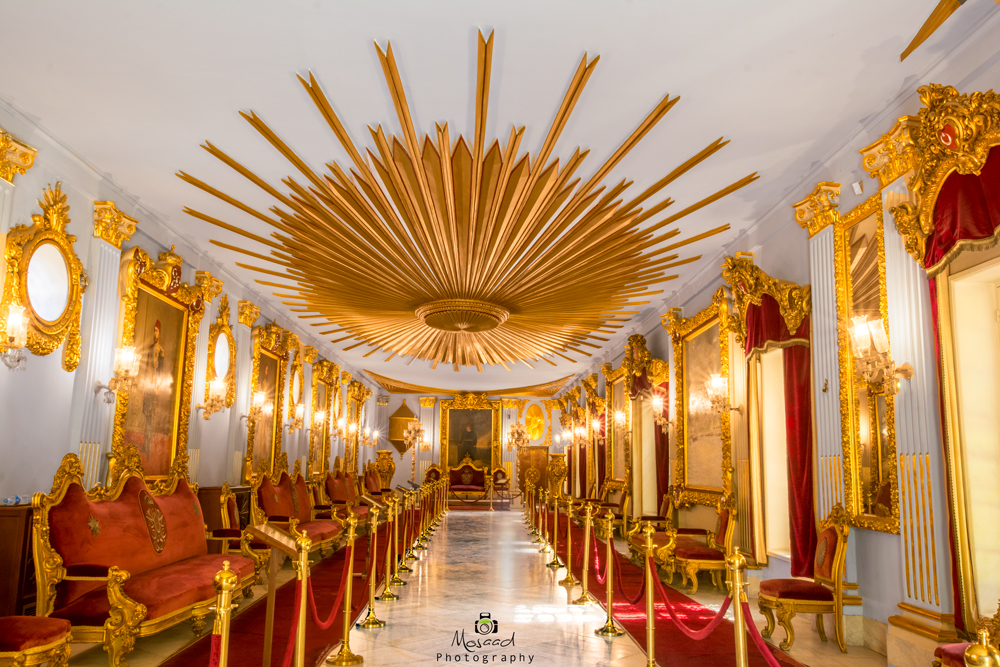
Throne Pavilion

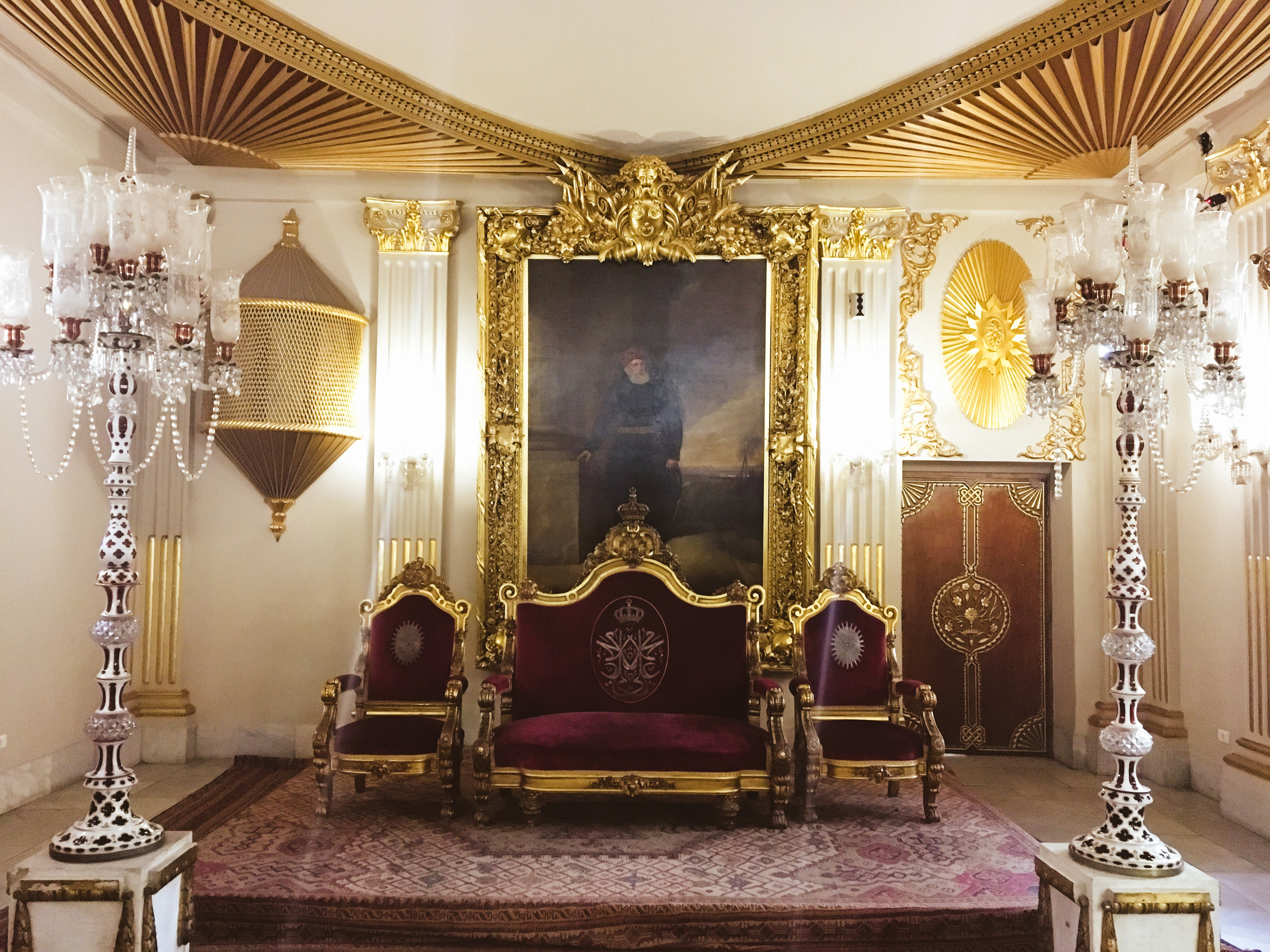
Throne Pavilion

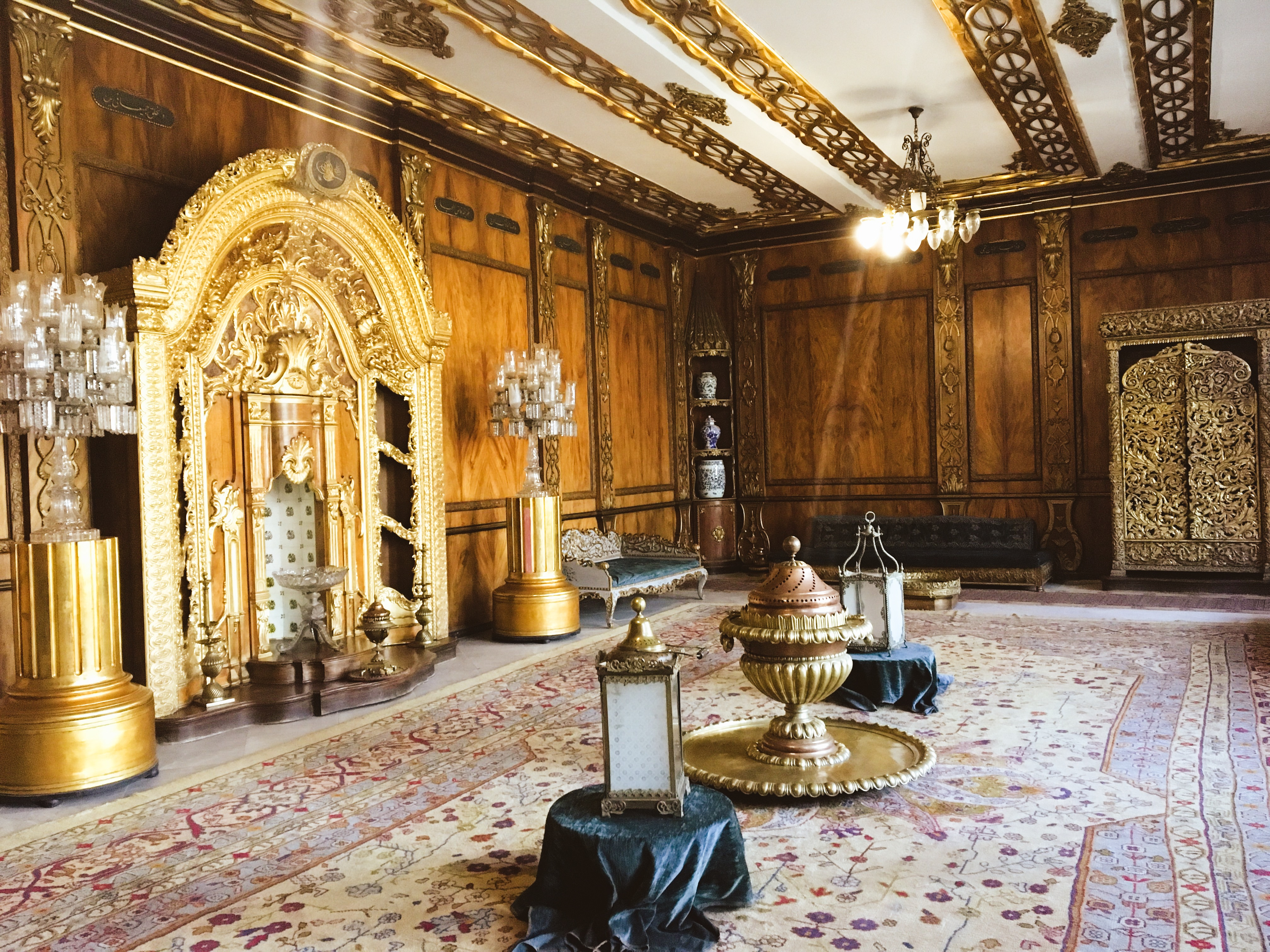
One of the two winter halls

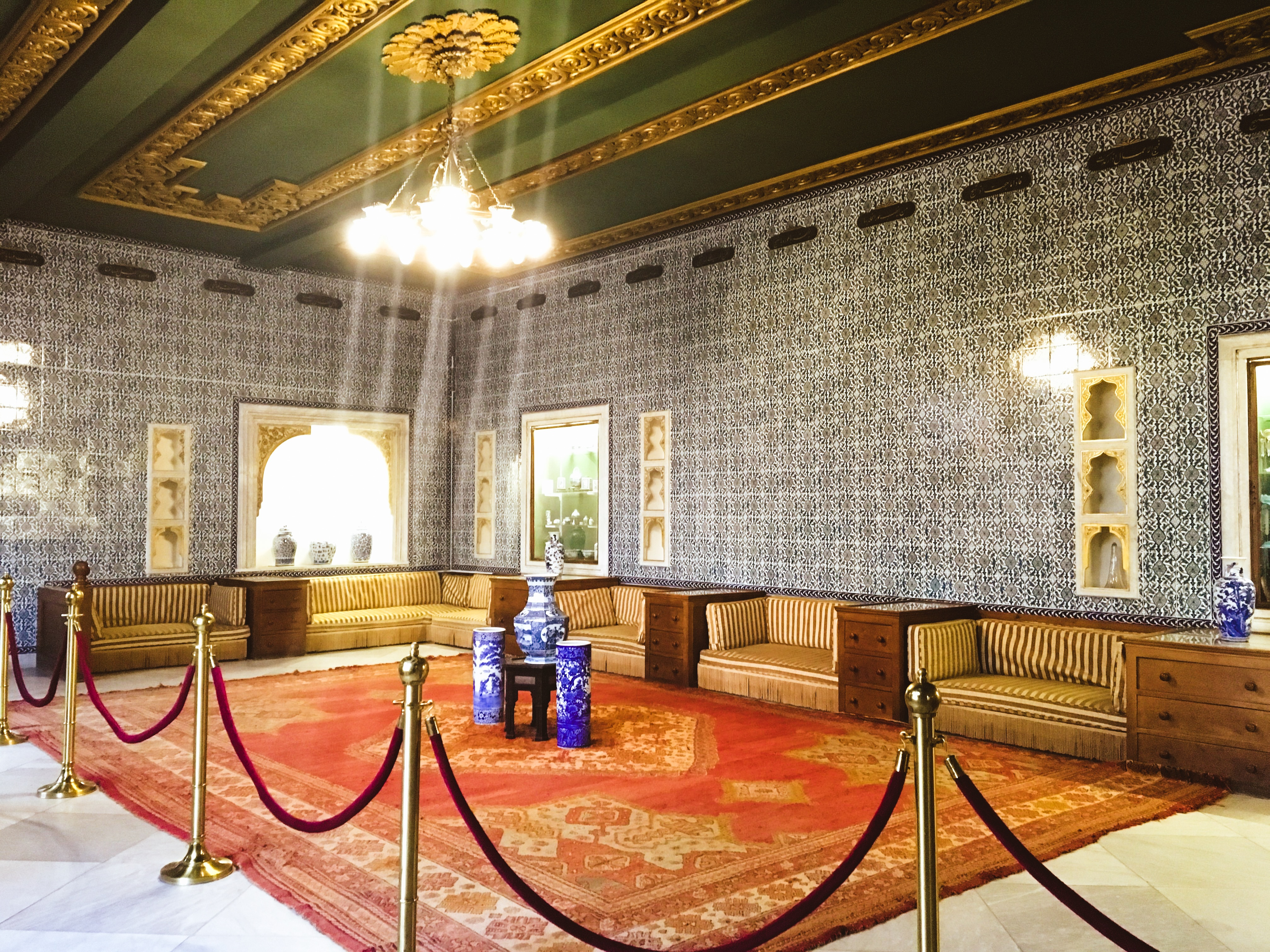
One of the two winter halls

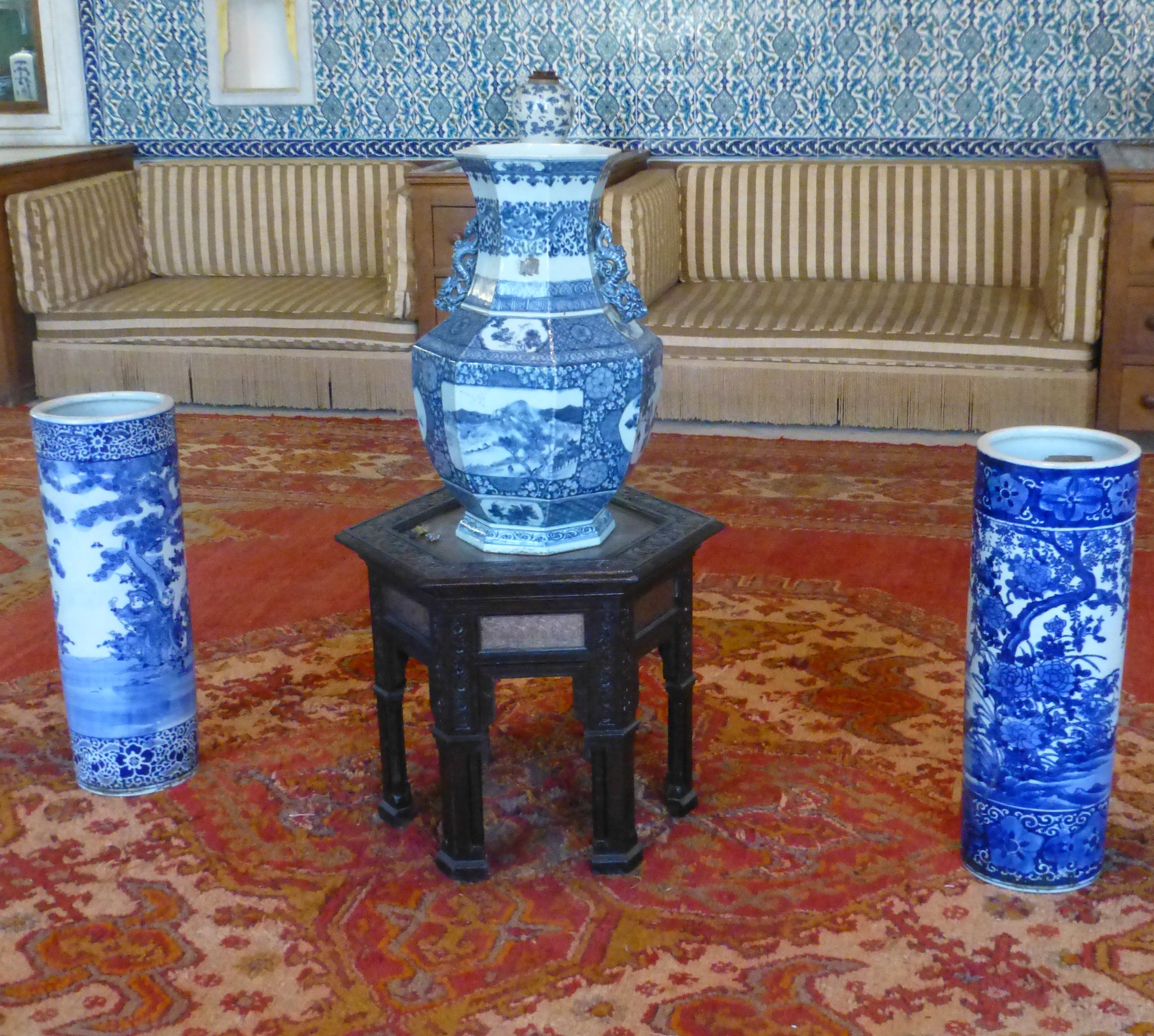
One of the two winter halls

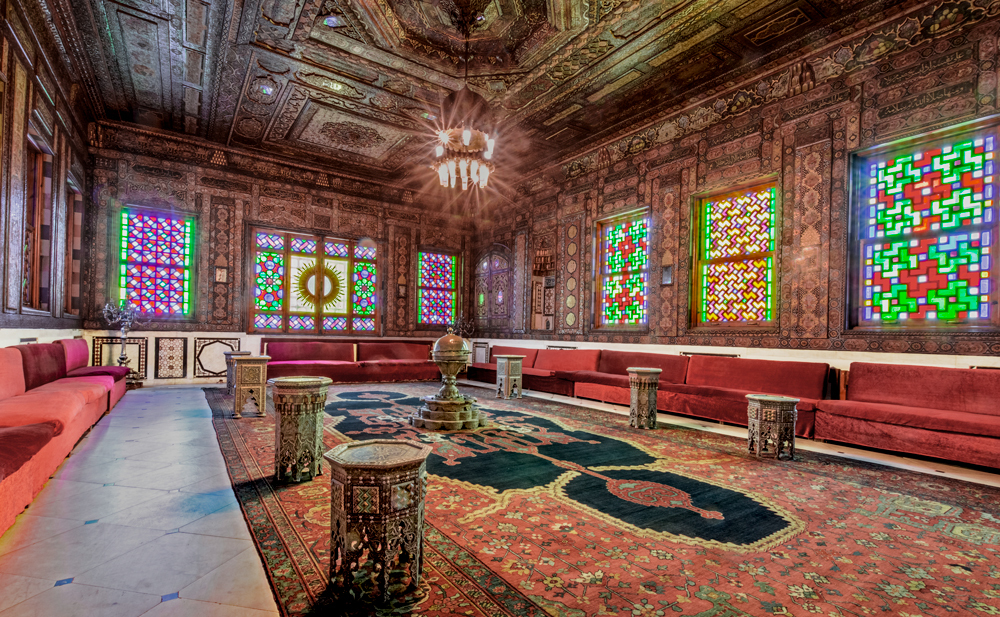
The Levantine Hall in the Reception Serail

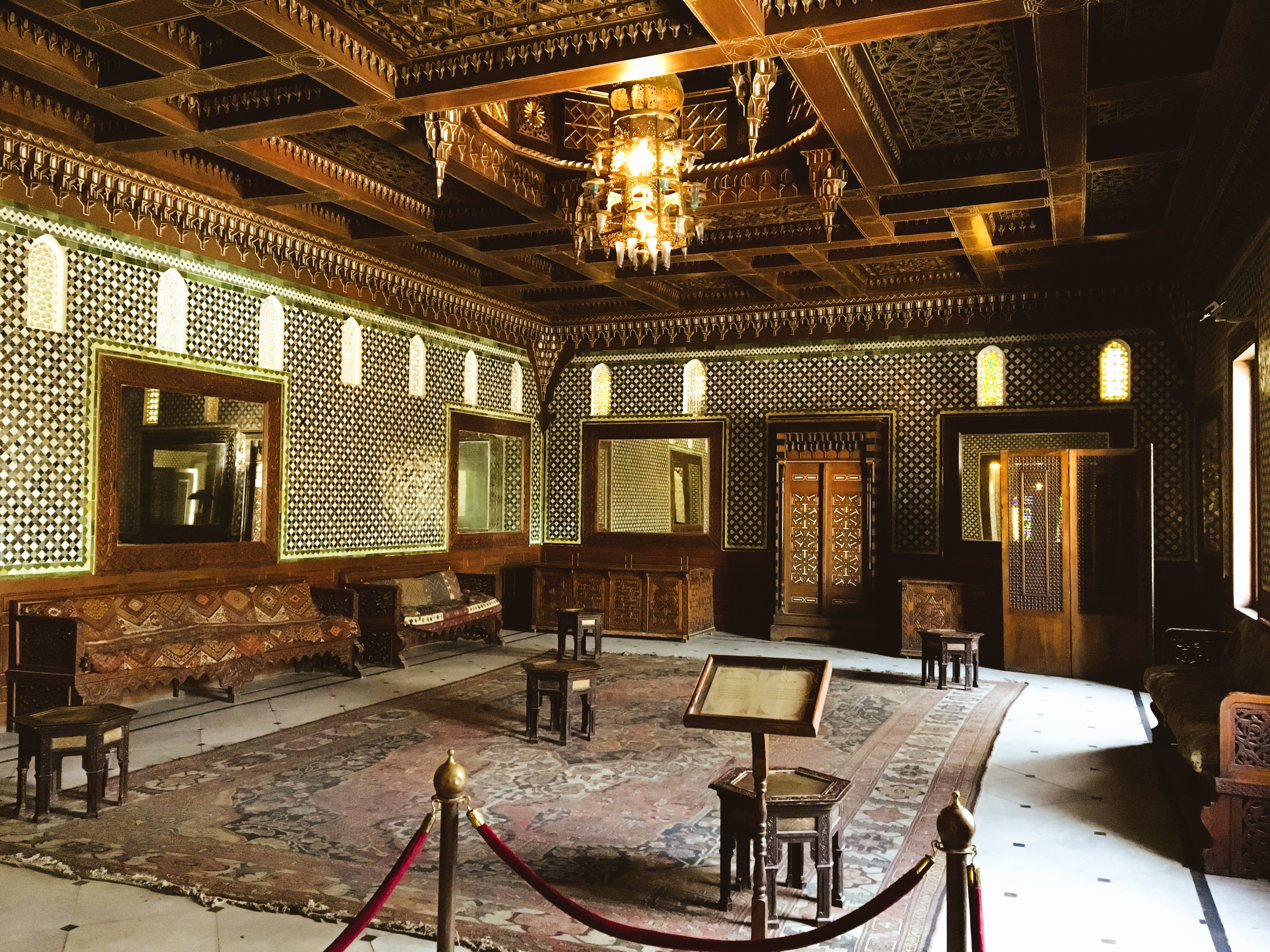
The Moroccan Hall at the Reception Serail

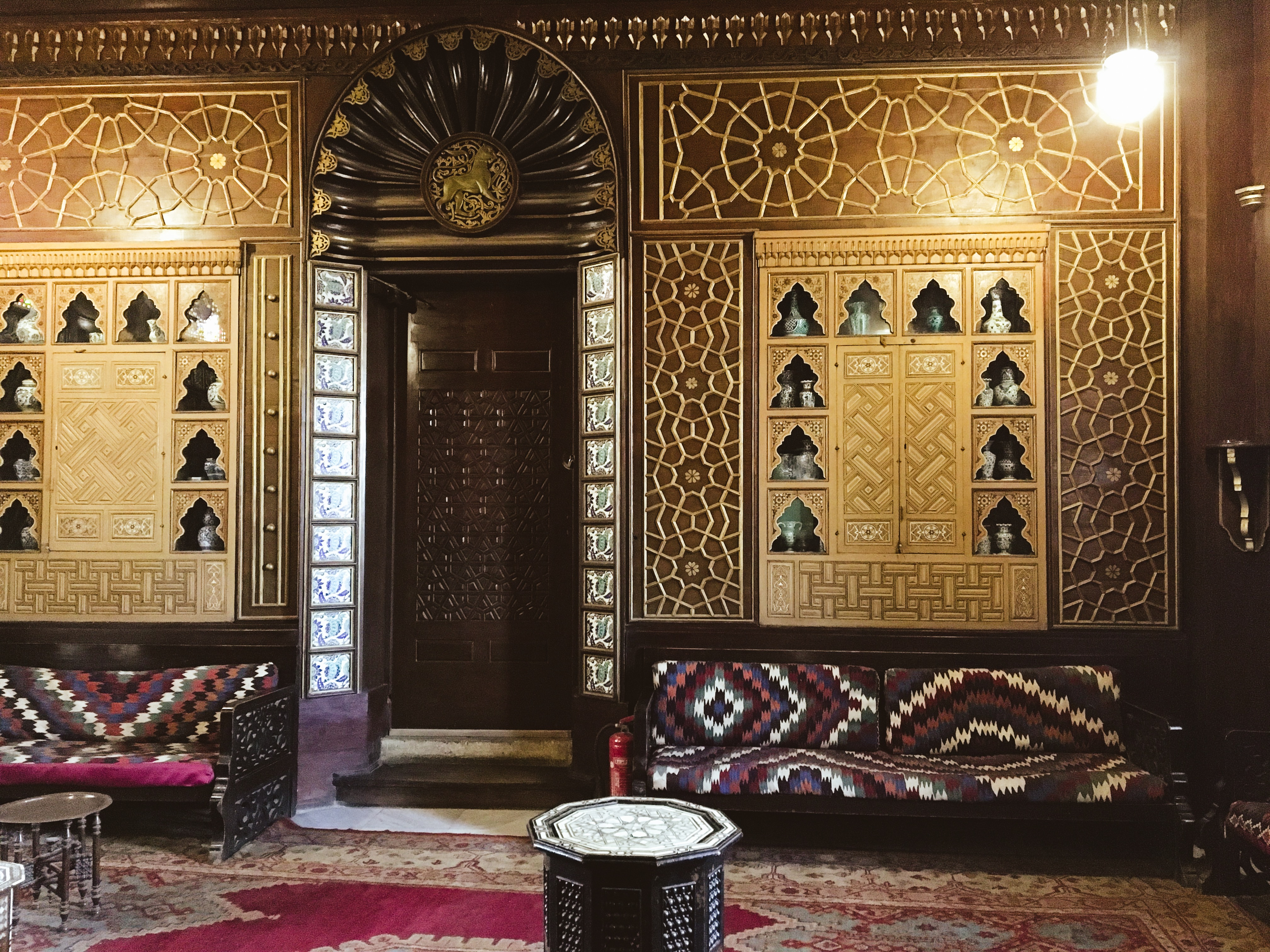
VIP Reception Room in the Reception Center

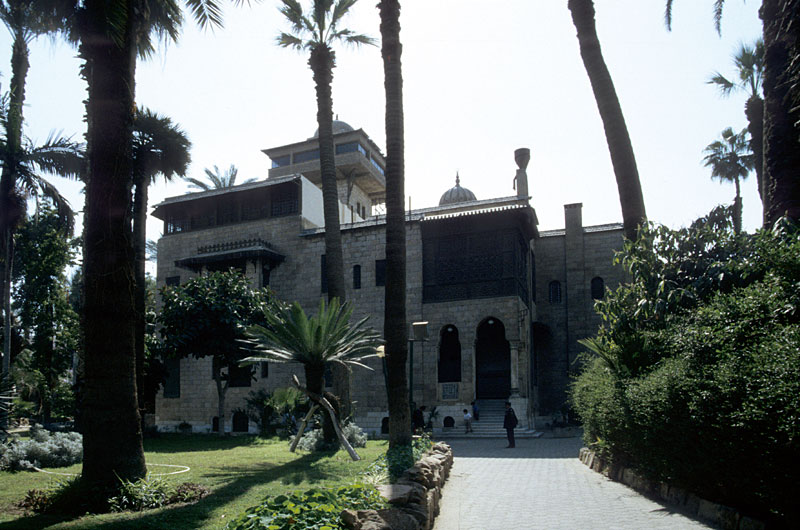
Residence beds

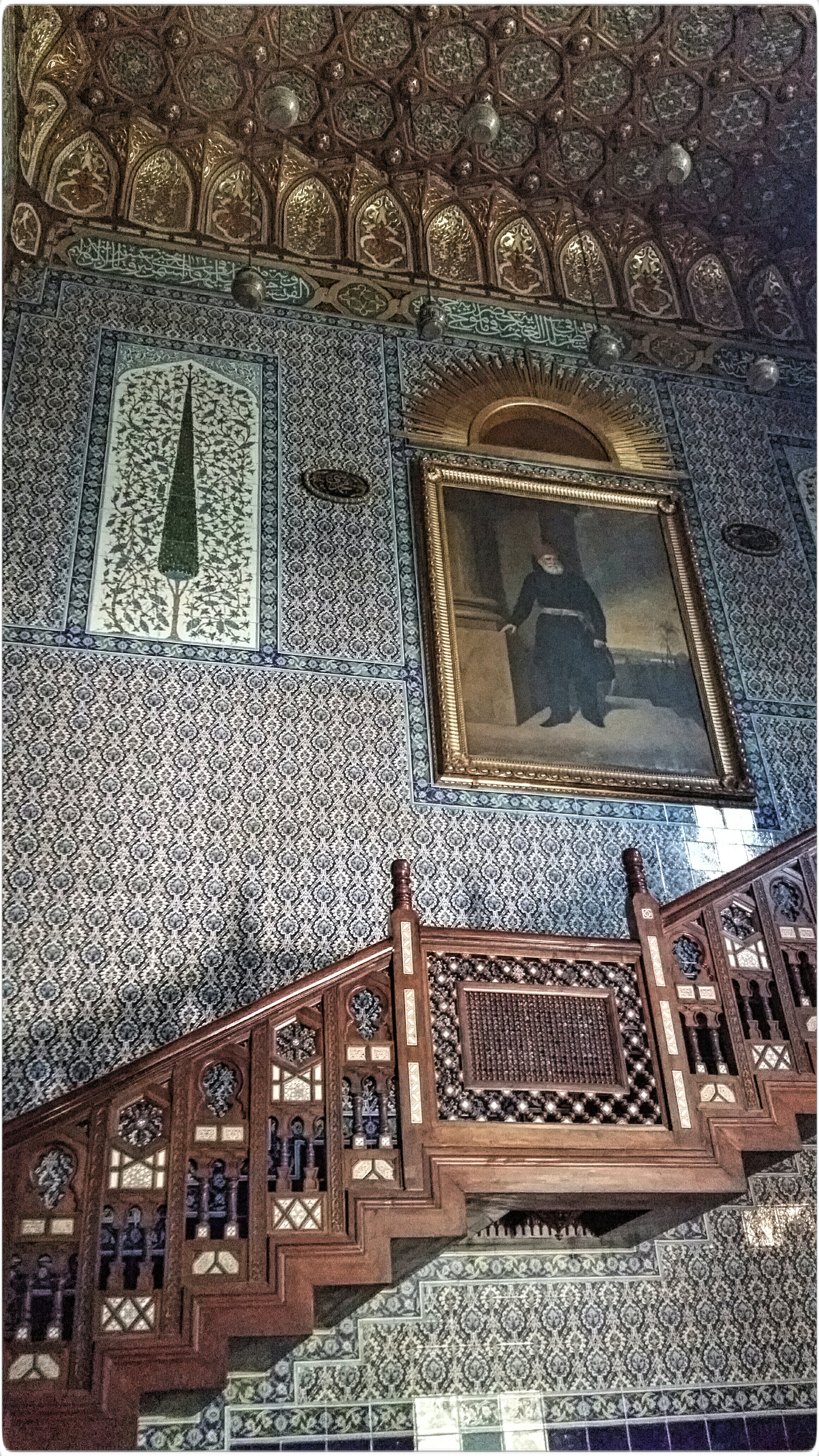
The wooden staircase in the residence hall

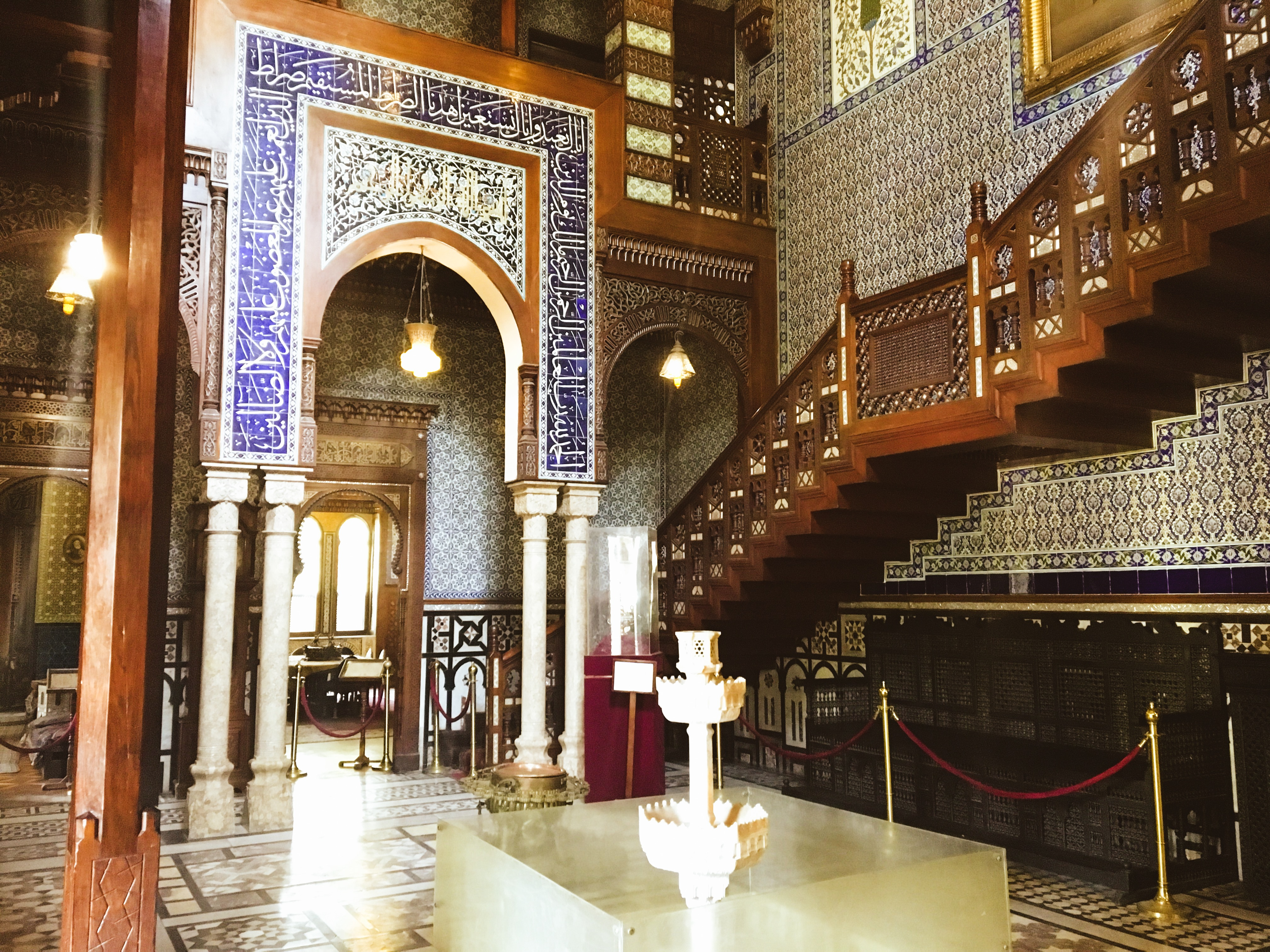
Fountain Foyer of the Iqama Saray

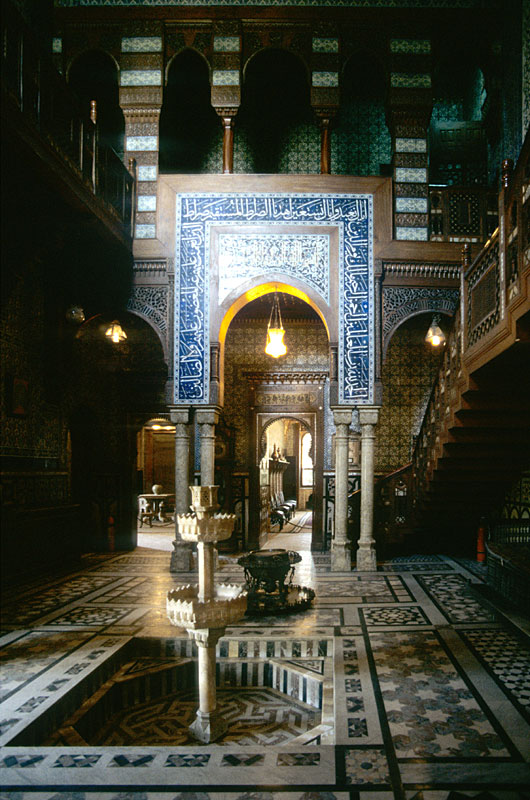
Fountain Foyer of the Iqama Saray

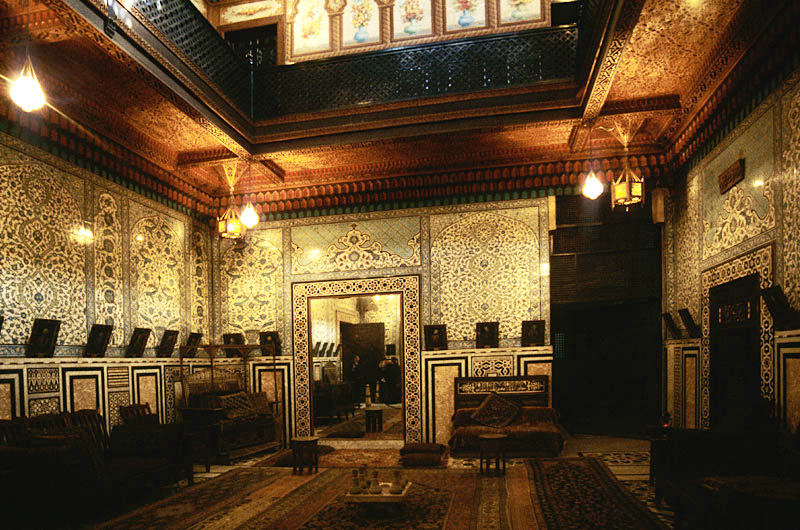
Foyer of Mirrors in the Residence Center

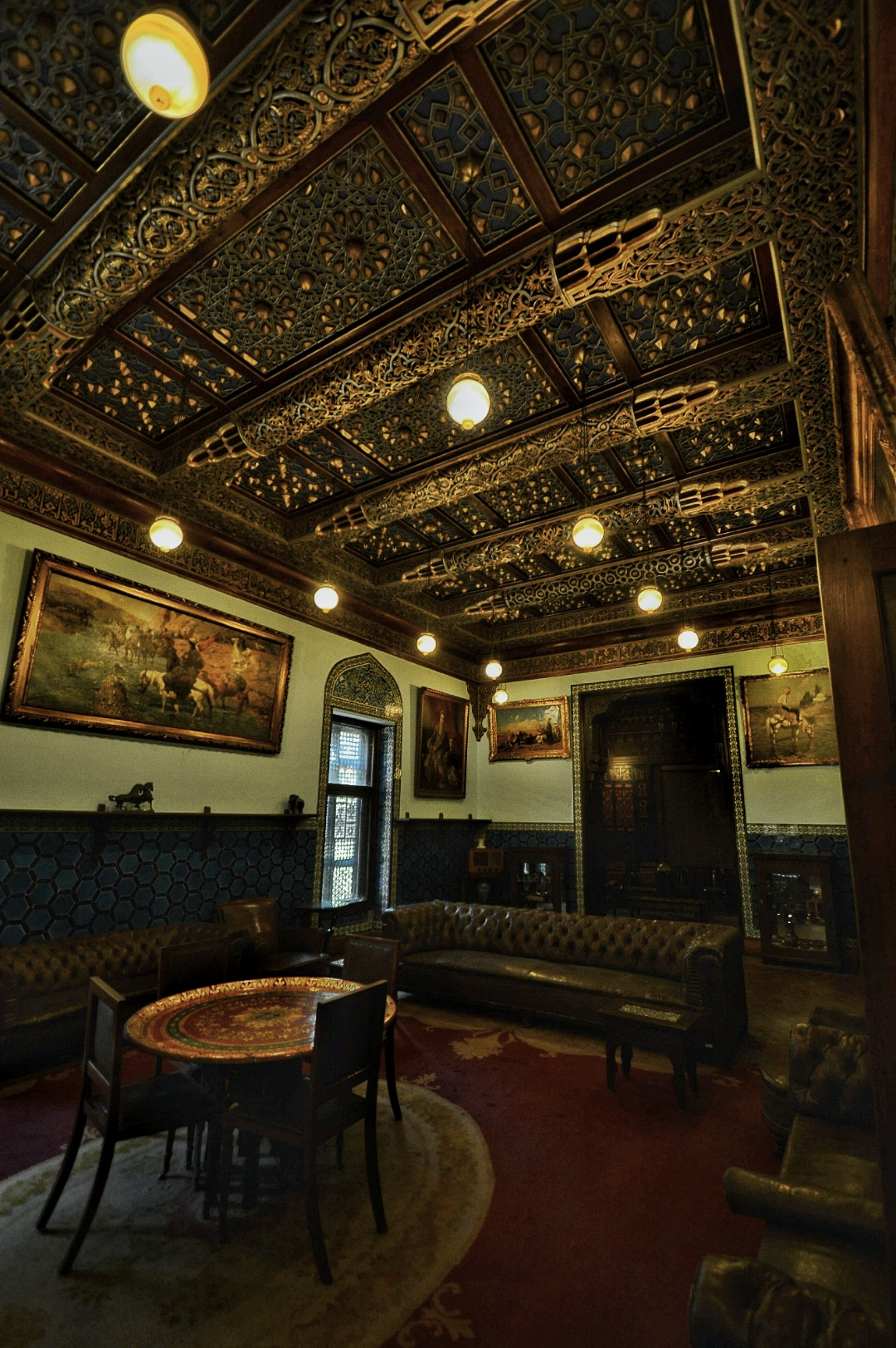
Blue Salon at the Residency

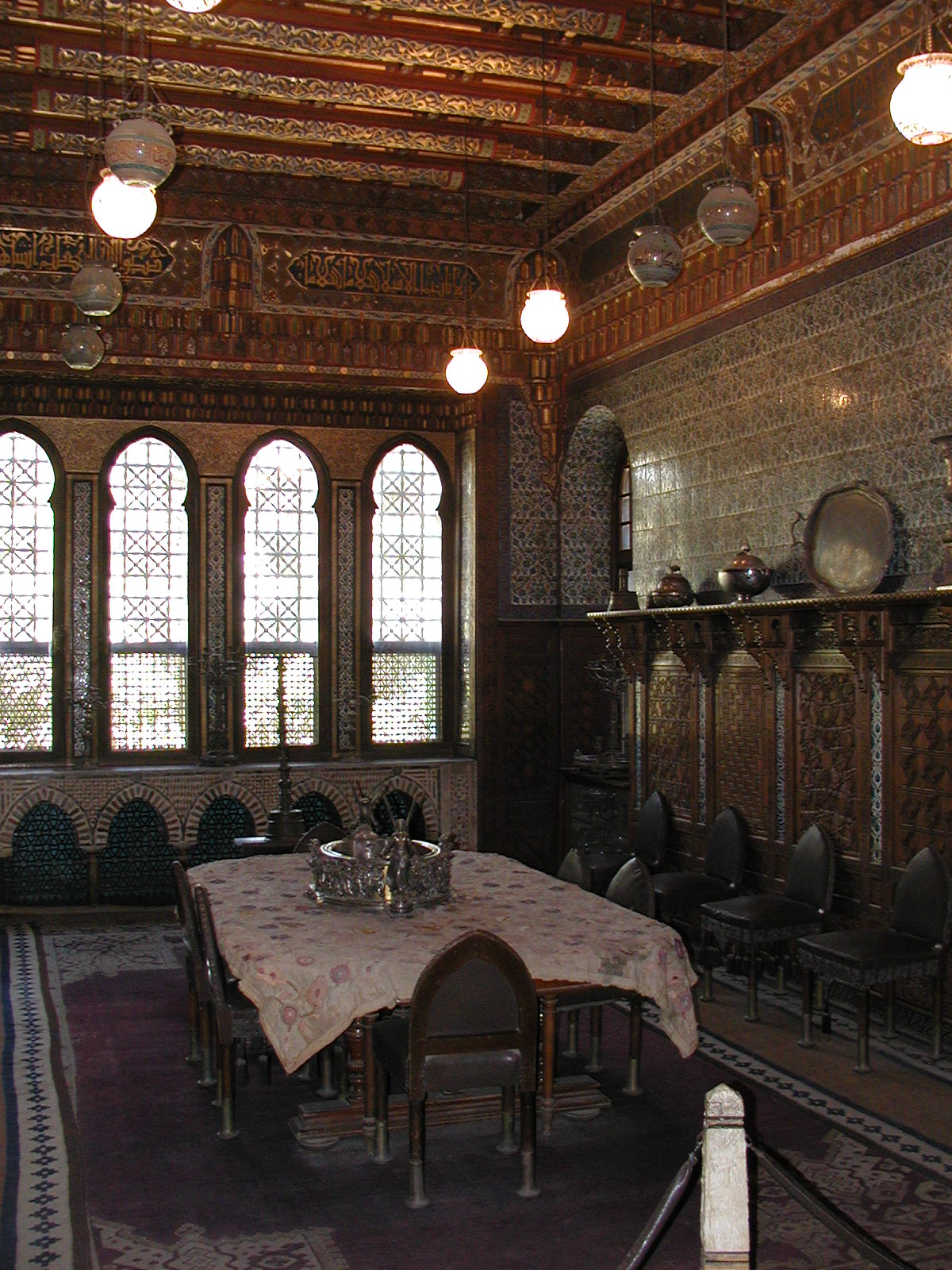
The dining room in the residence hall

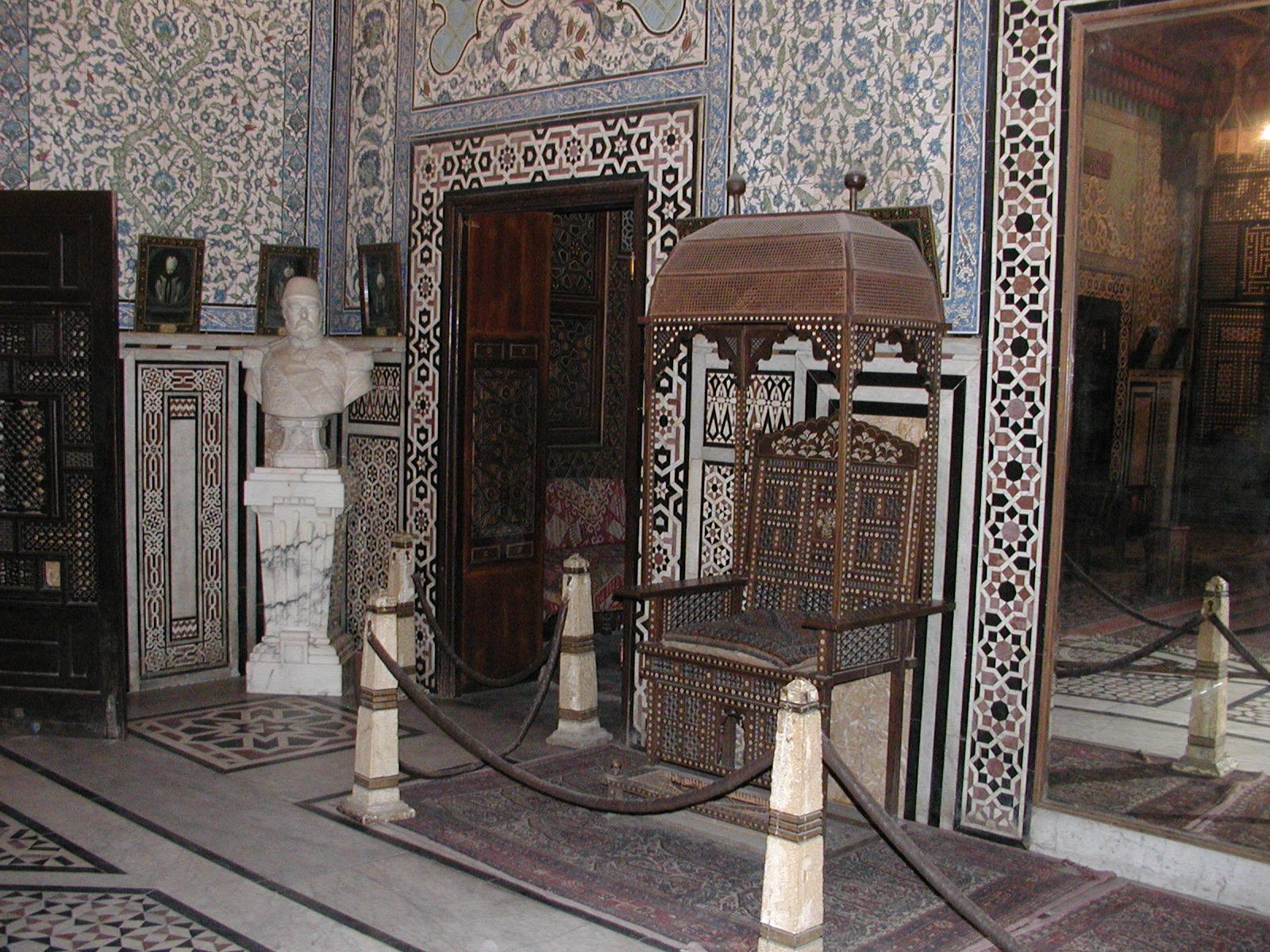
Residence beds

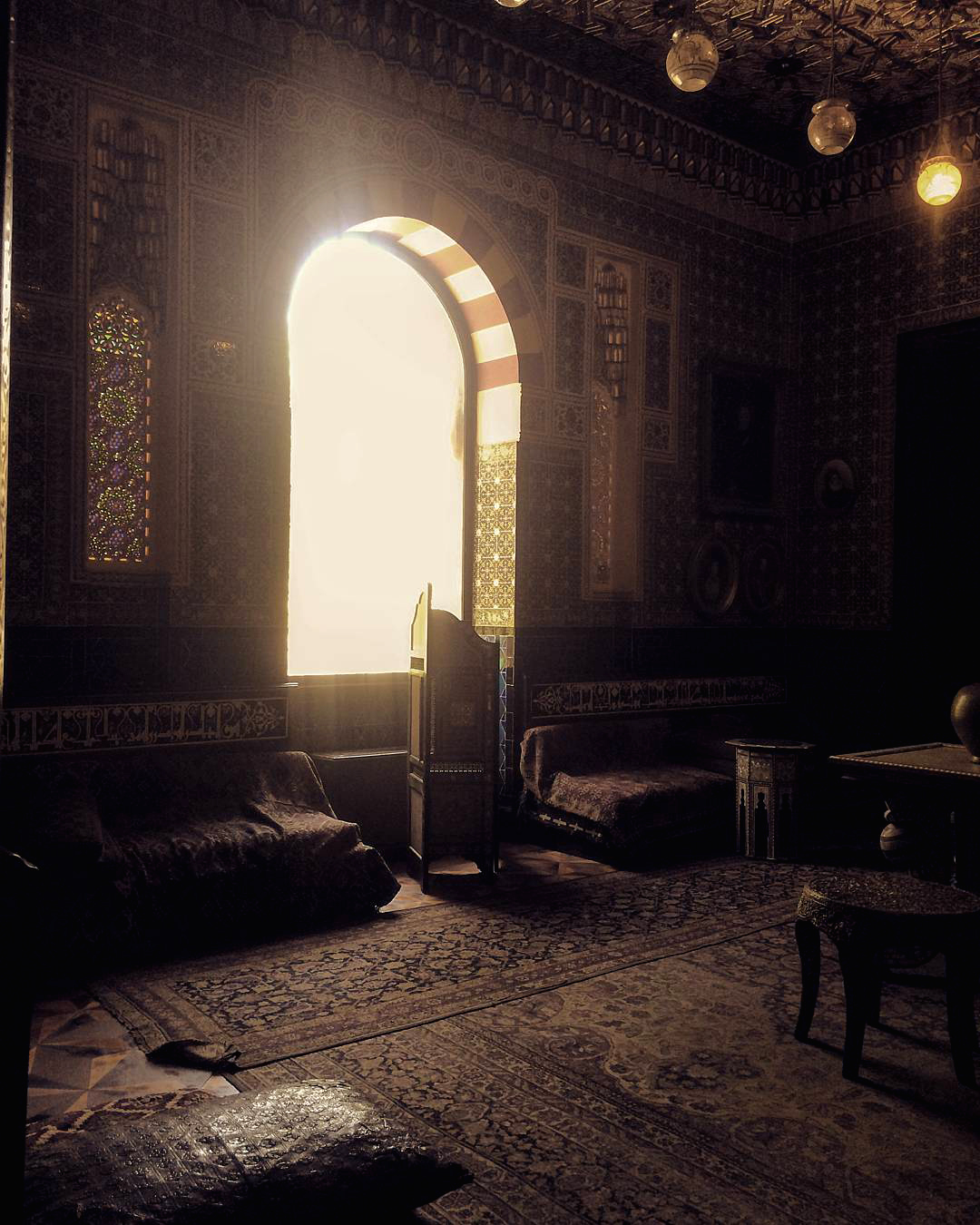
One of the palace halls
Garden

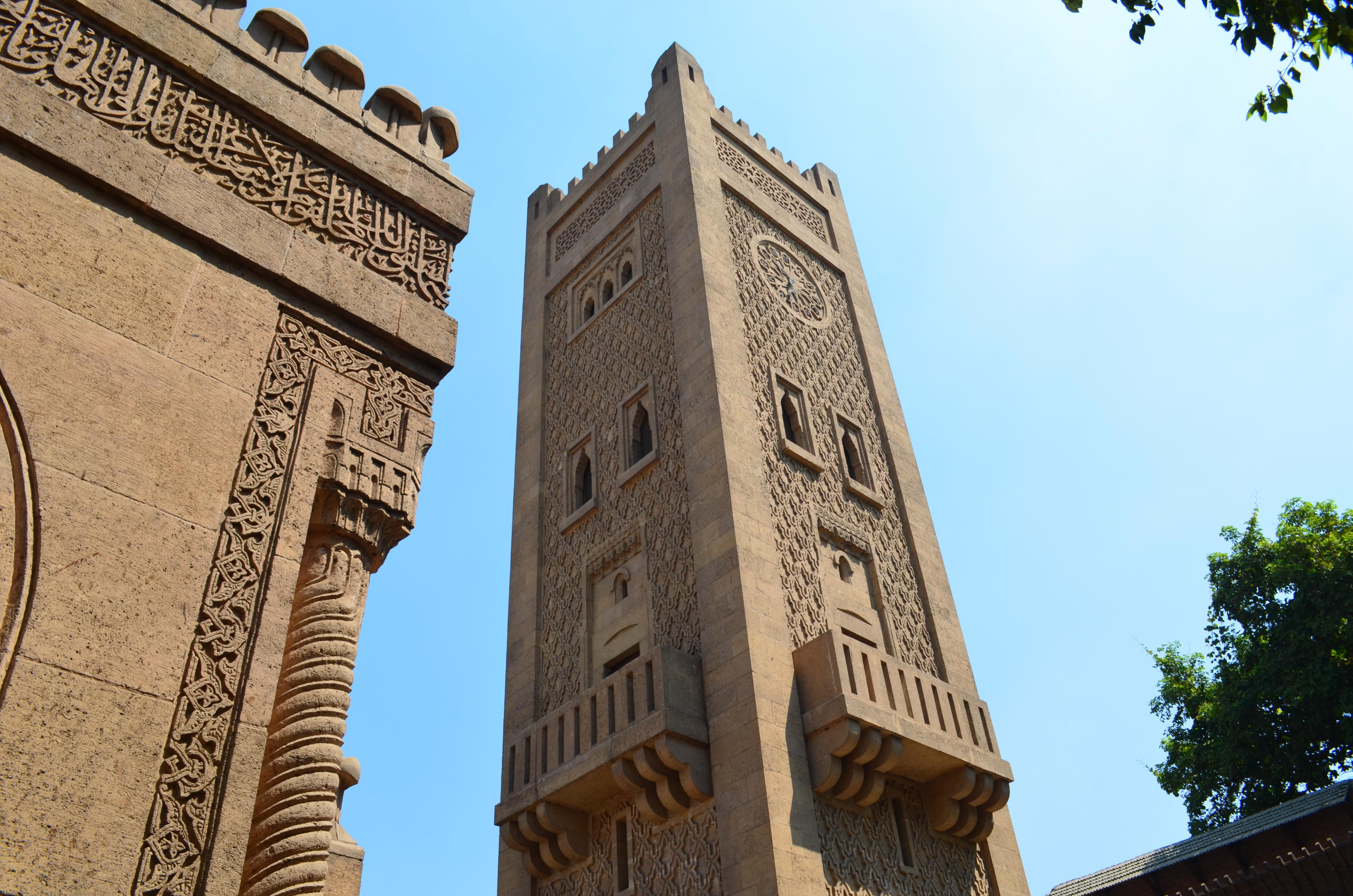
Clock tower

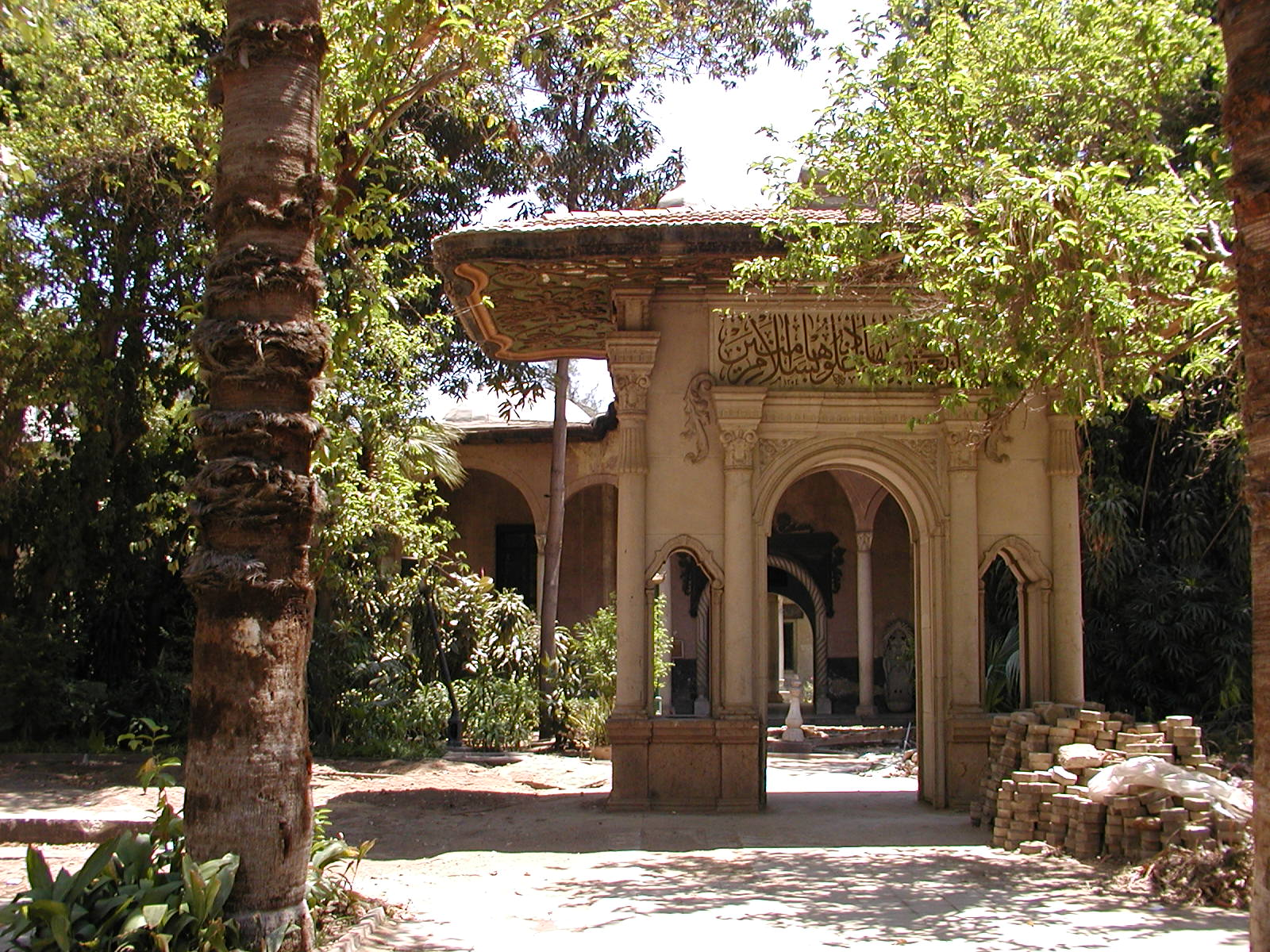
The garden

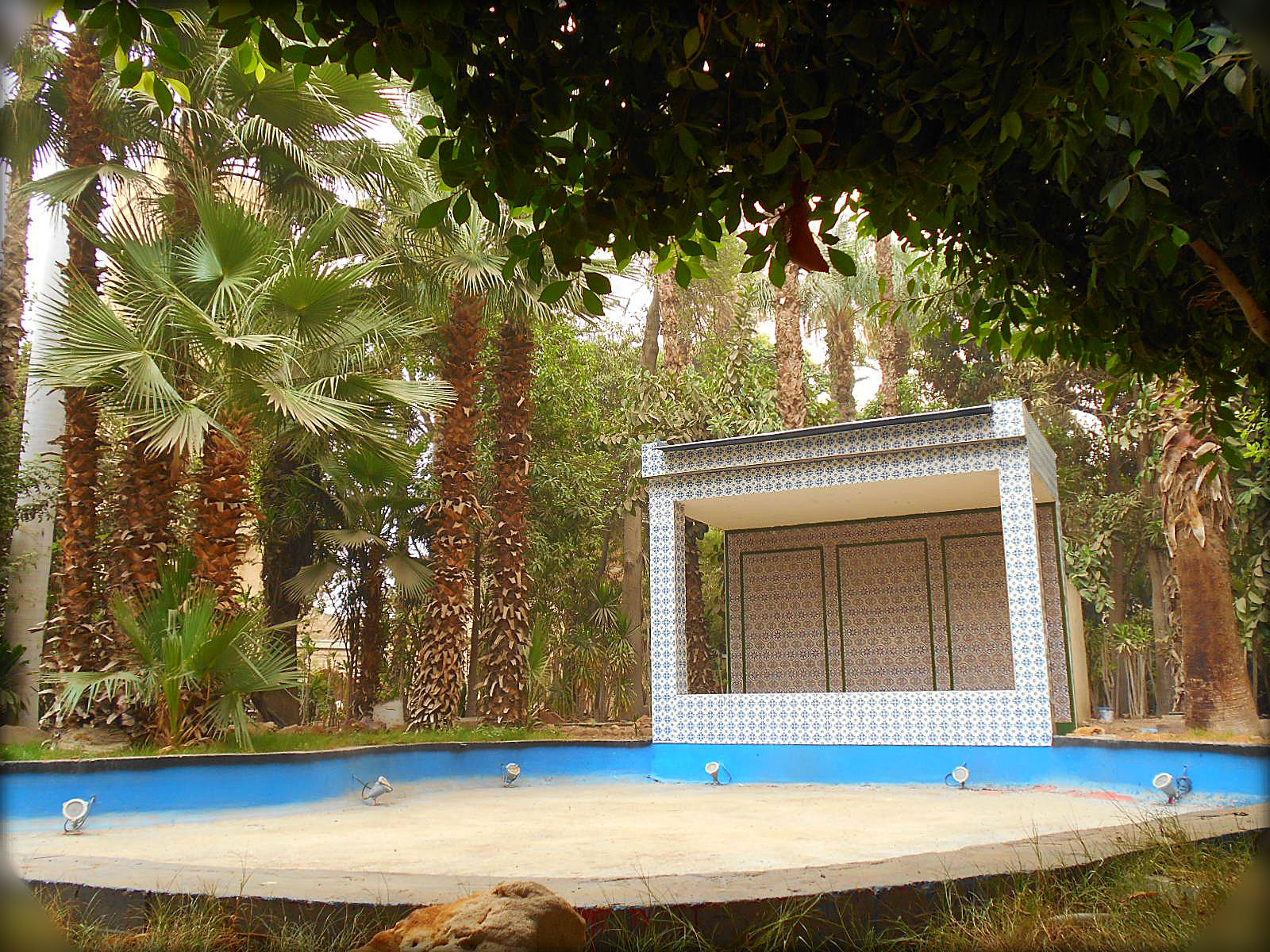
The garden

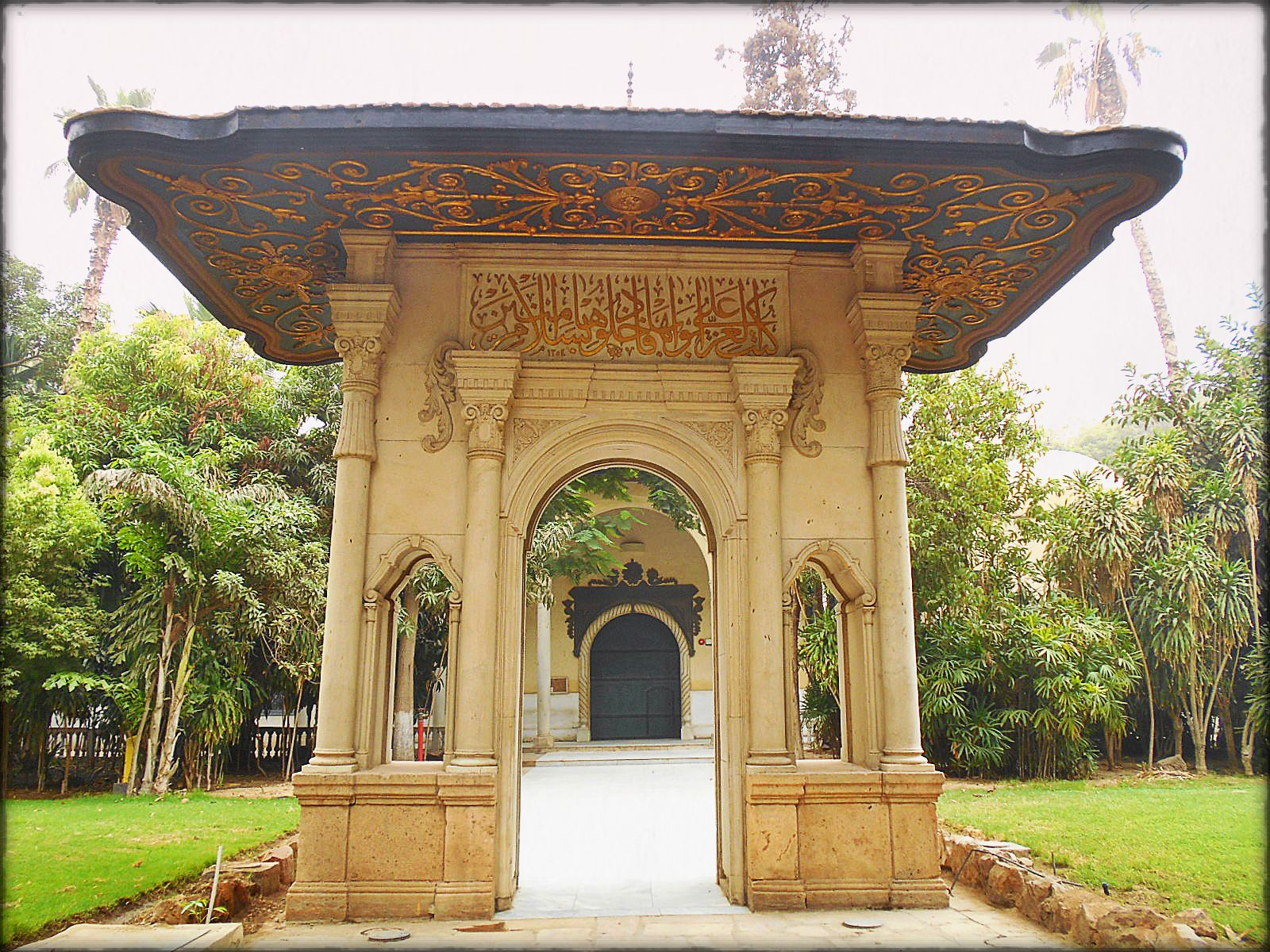
The garden

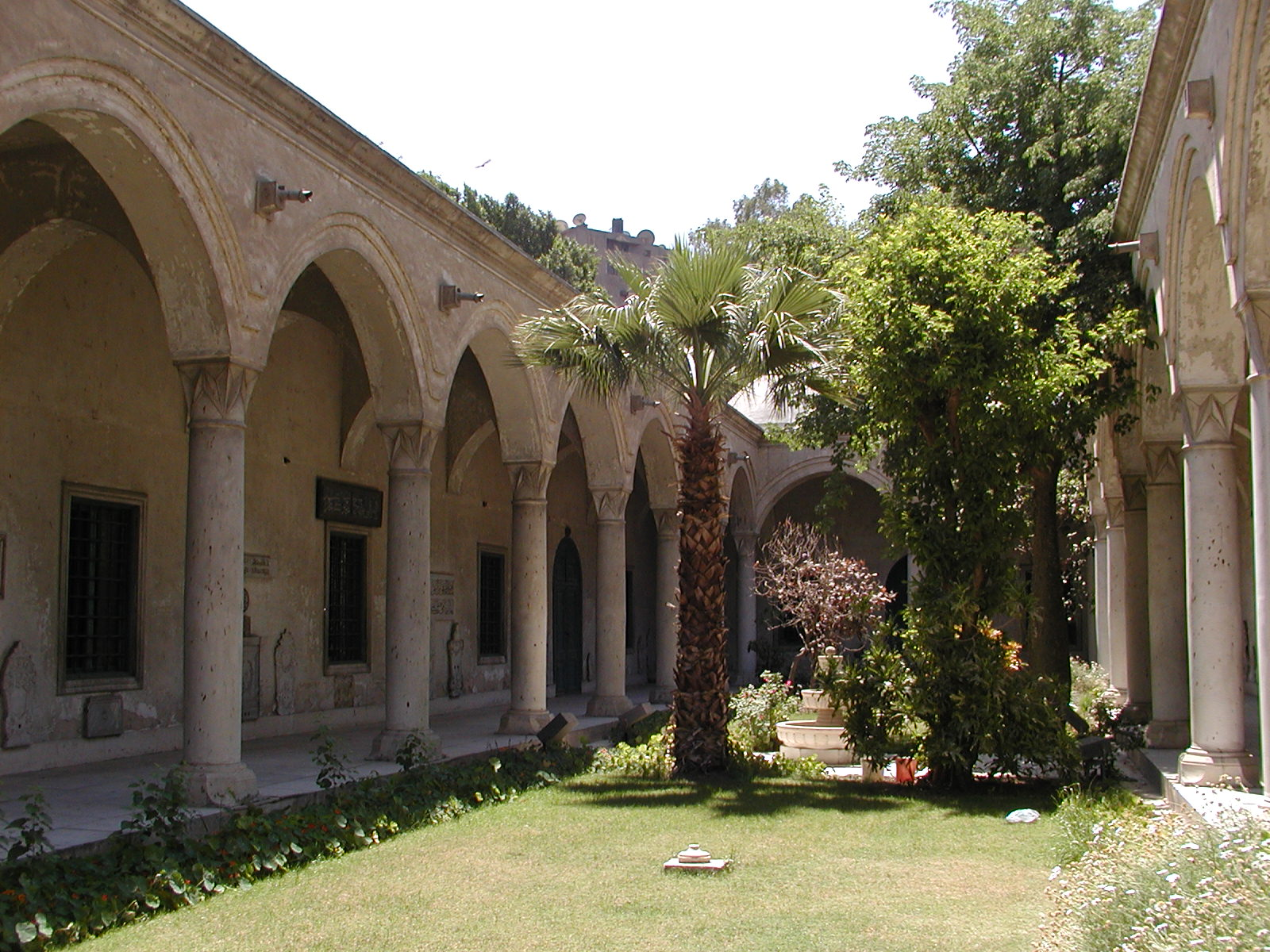
The garden

The garden

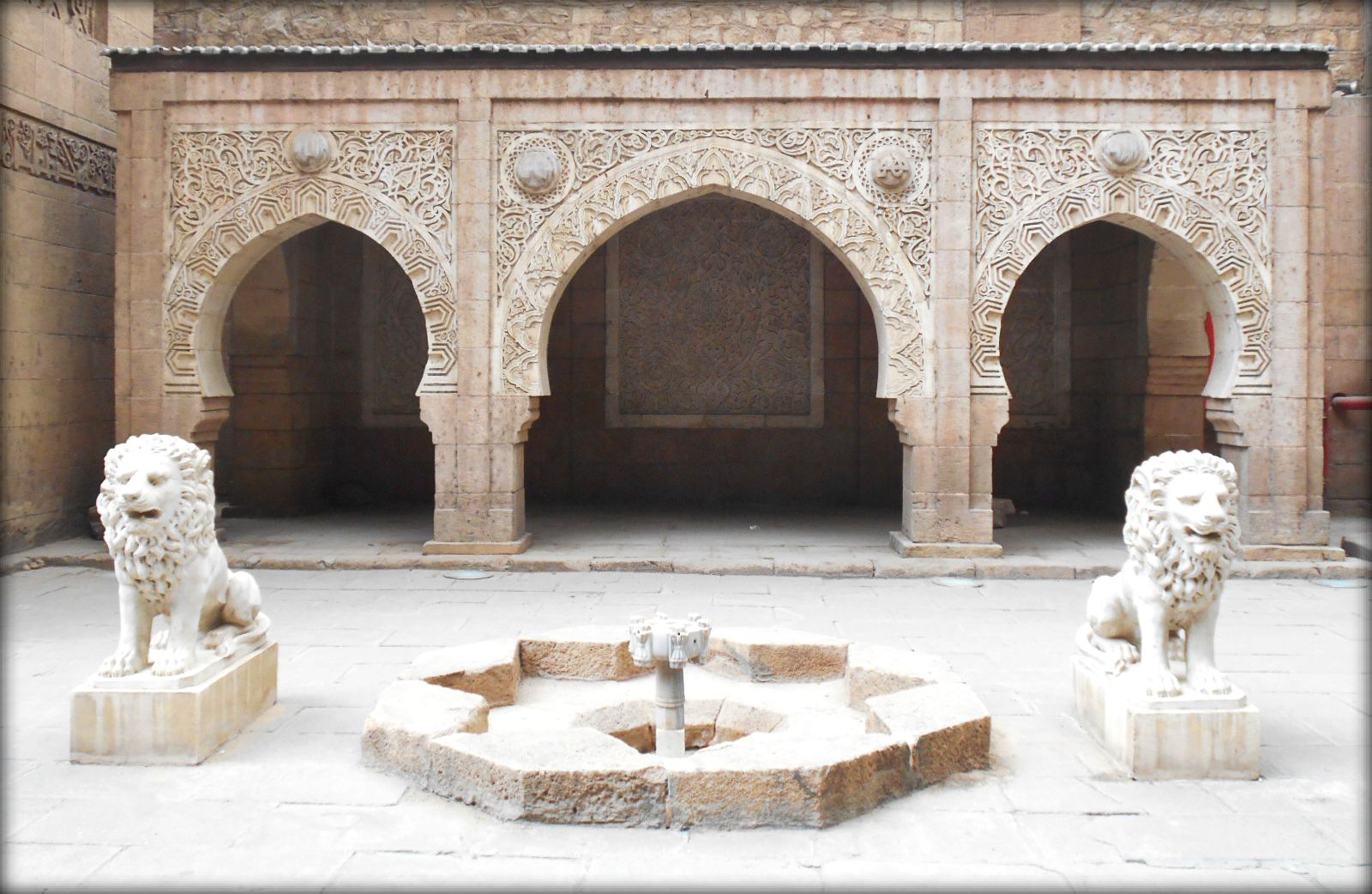
The garden

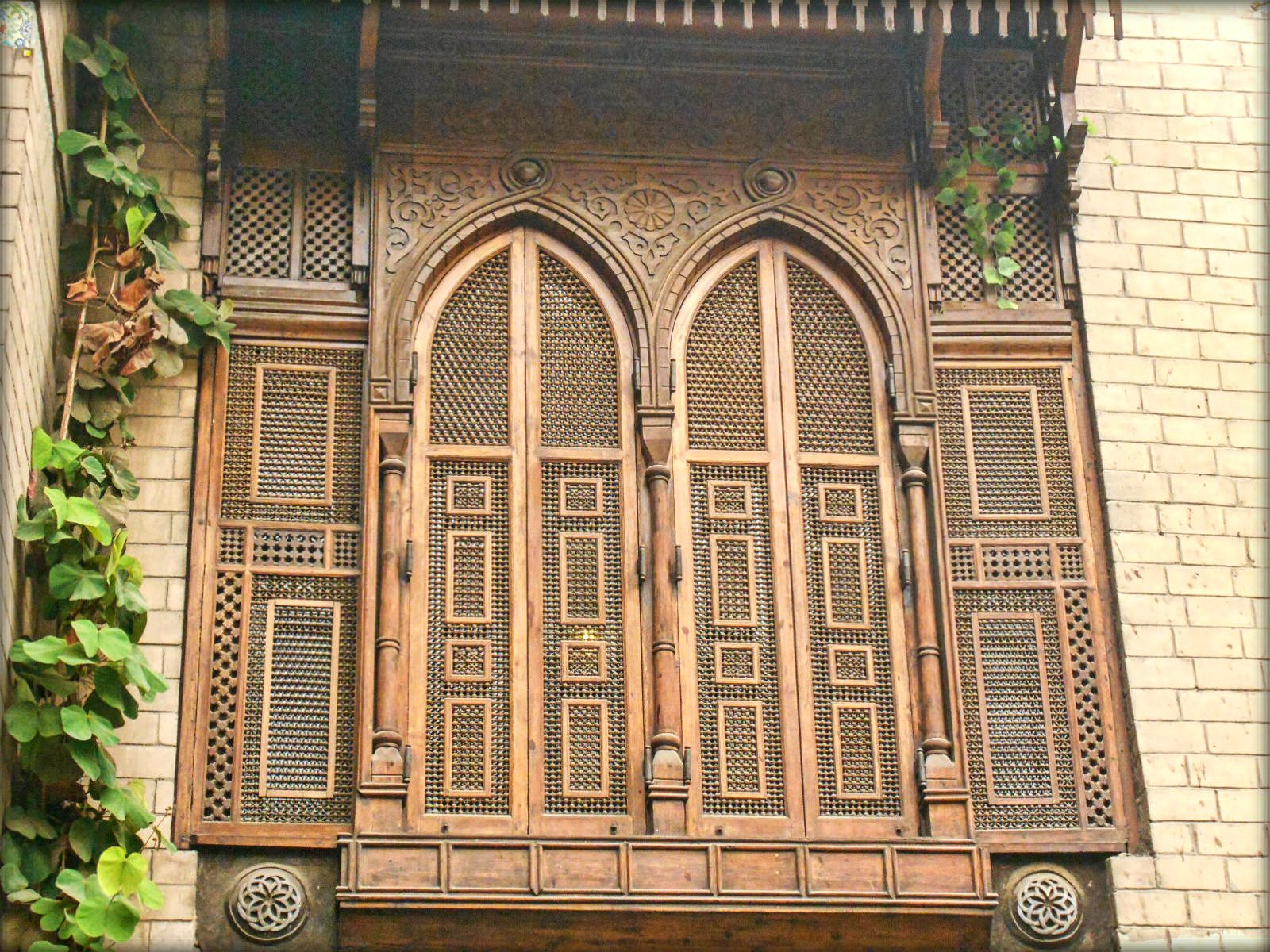
Mashrabiya

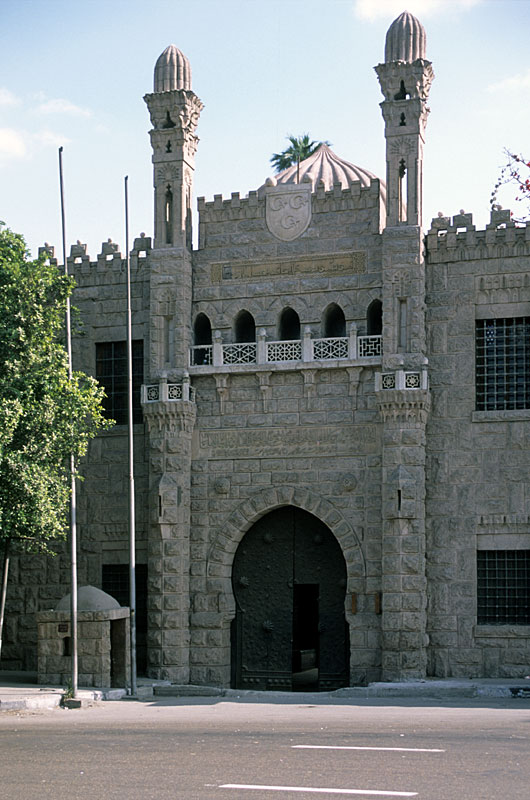
Entrance to the palace

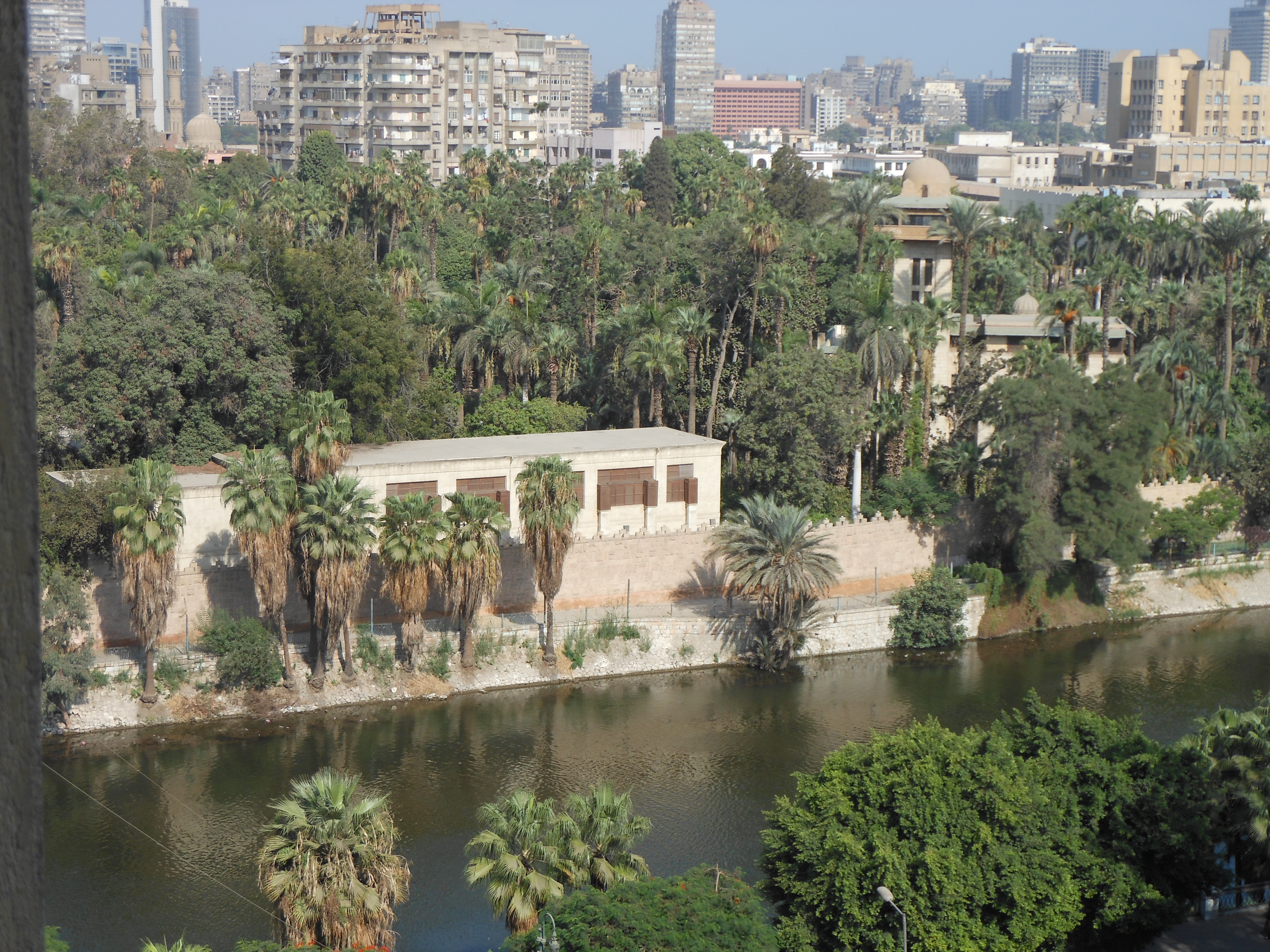
The eastern side of the palace overlooking the Nile River
Museum

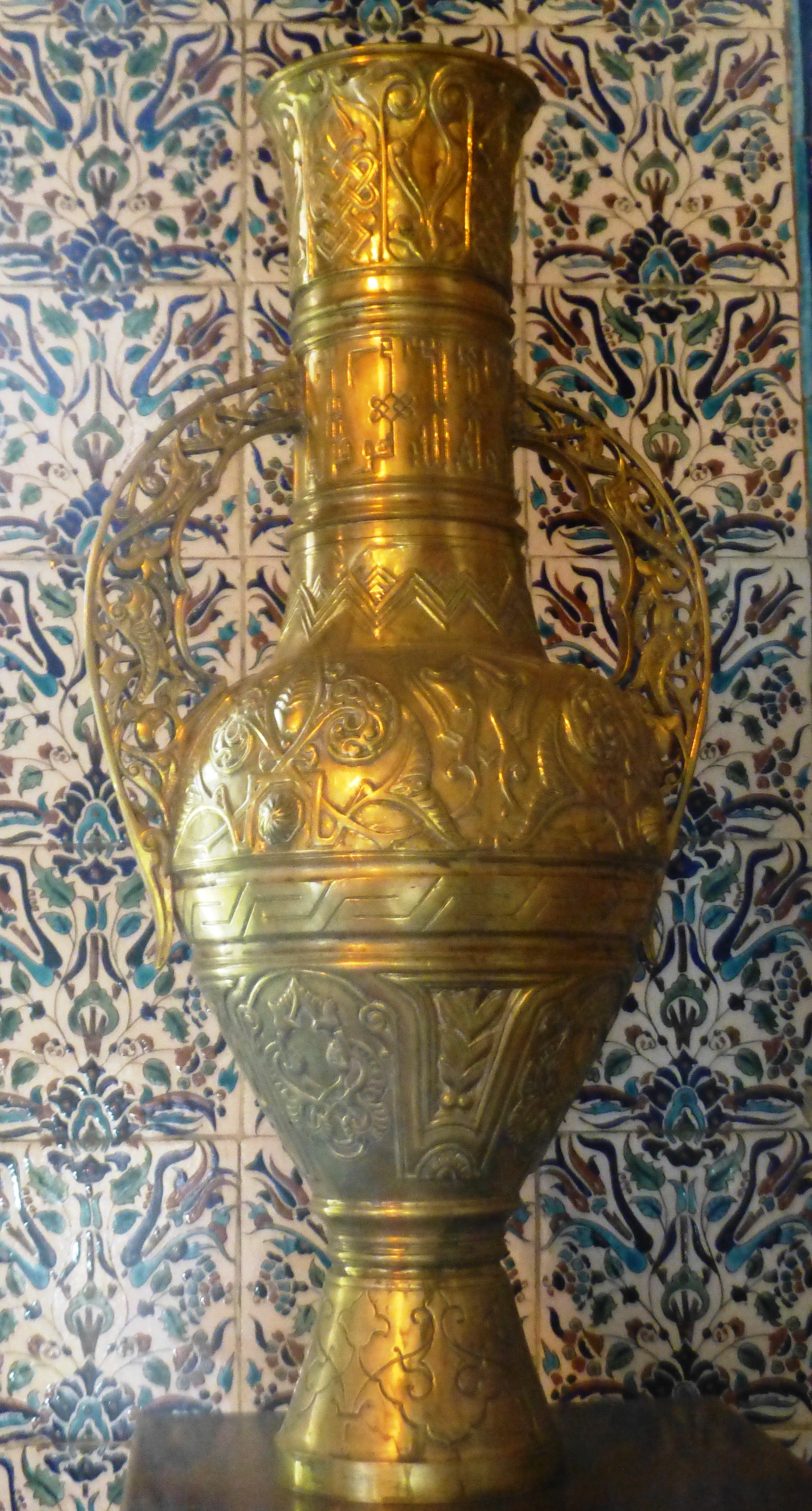
One of the palace's artifacts

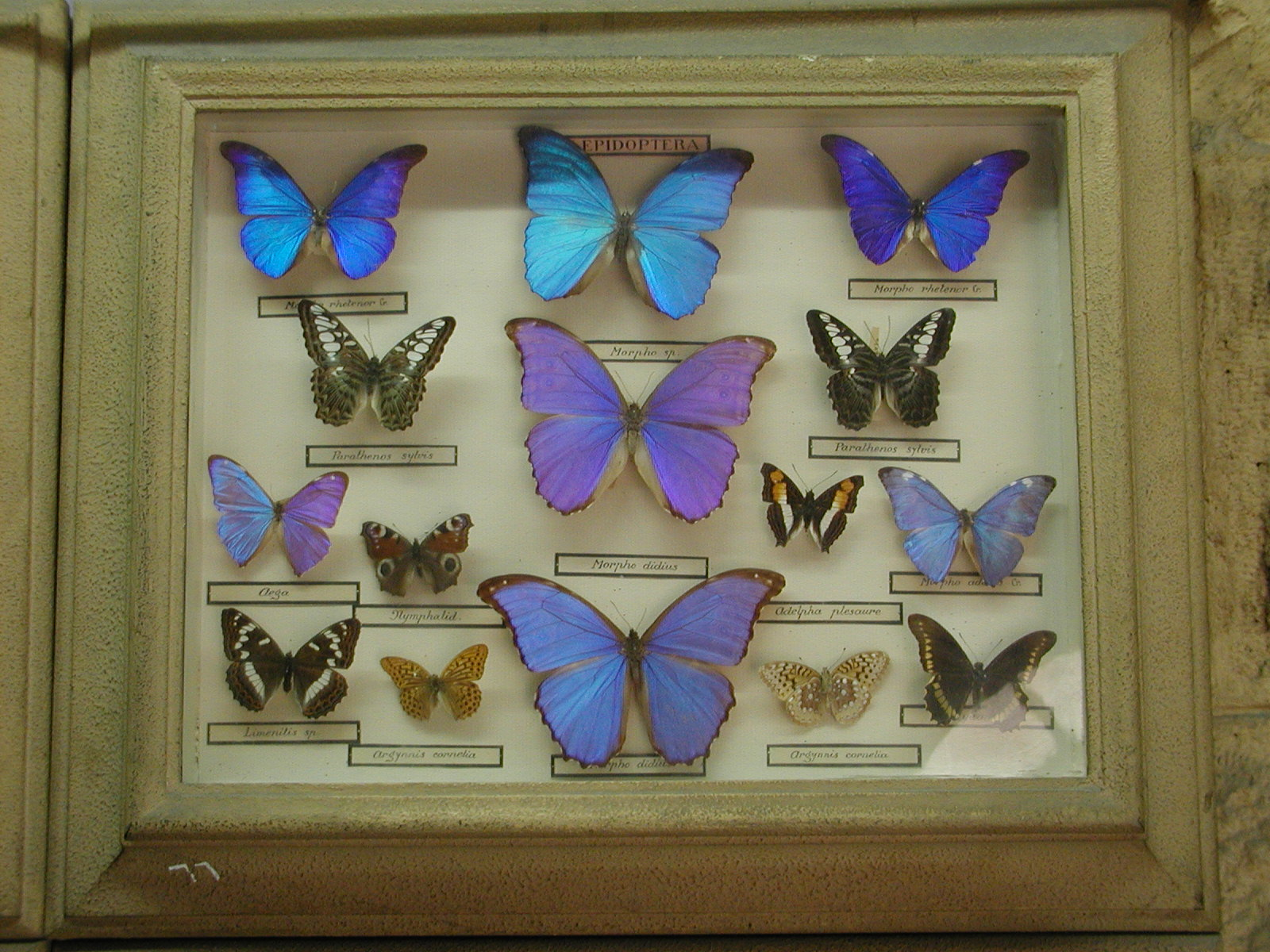
Fishing Museum

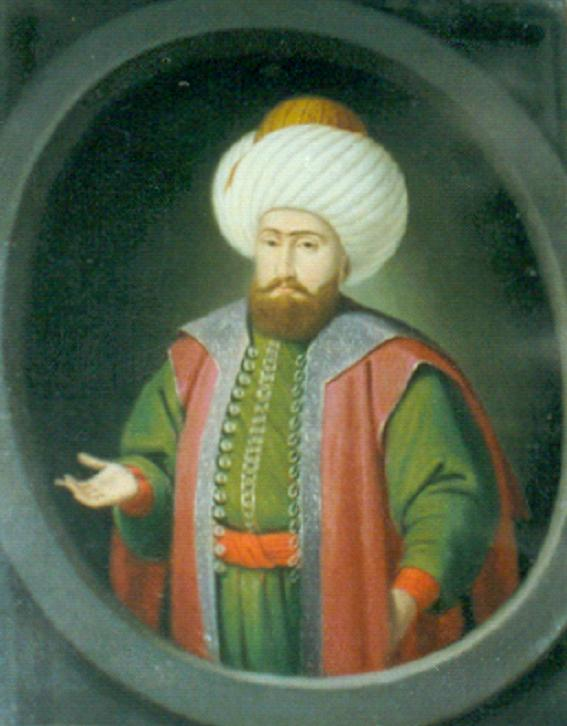
Museum

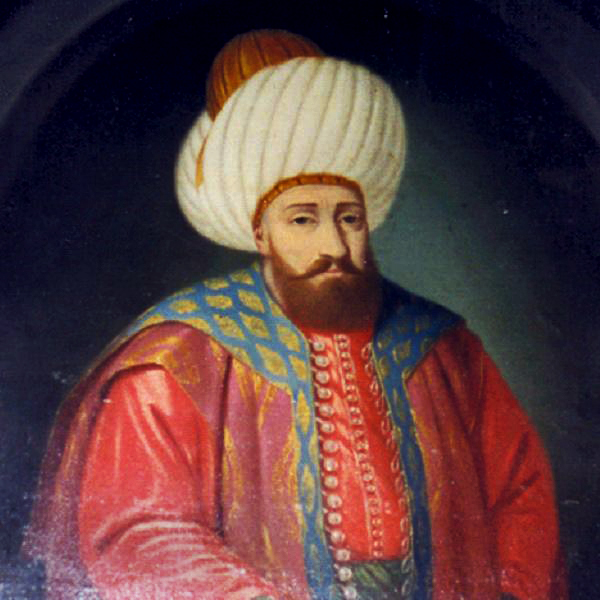
Museum

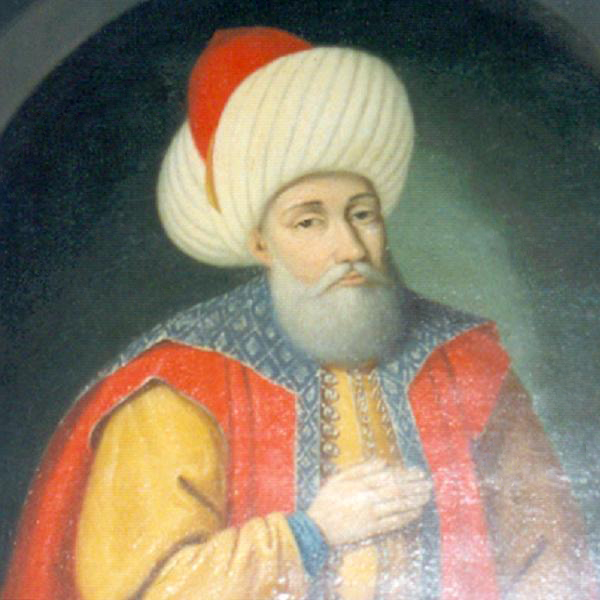
Museum

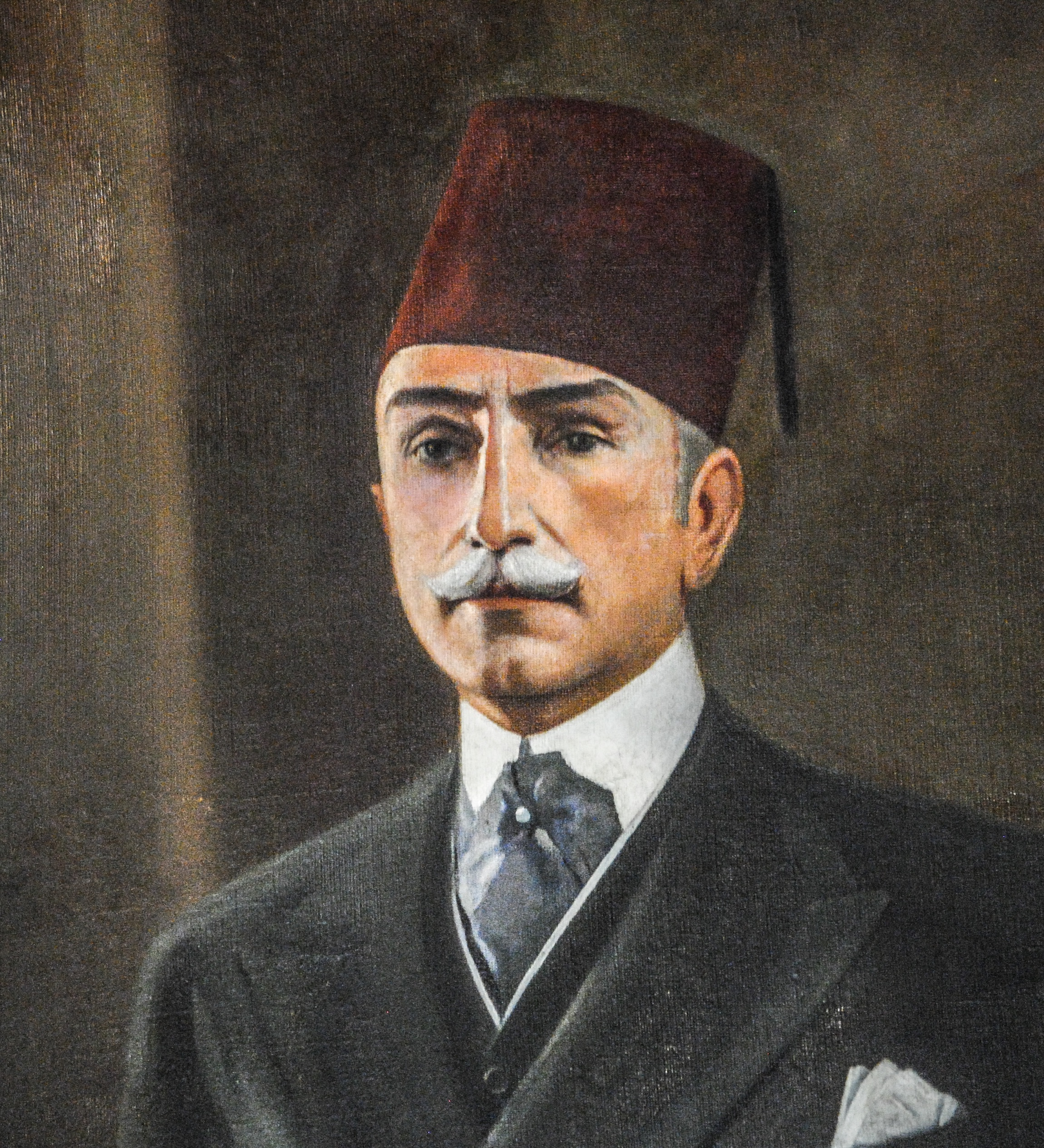
Museum
Mosque

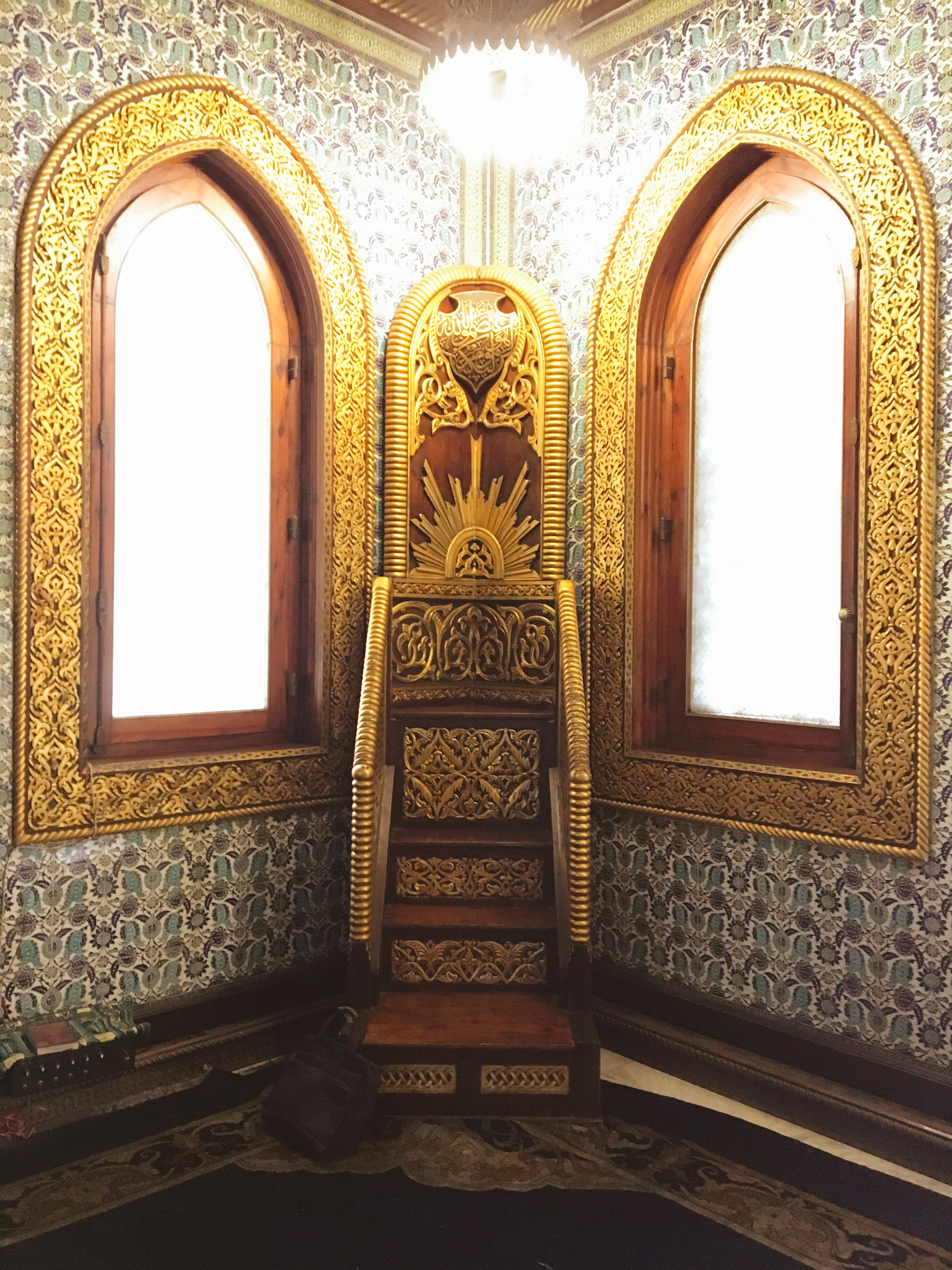
Pulpit of the mosque

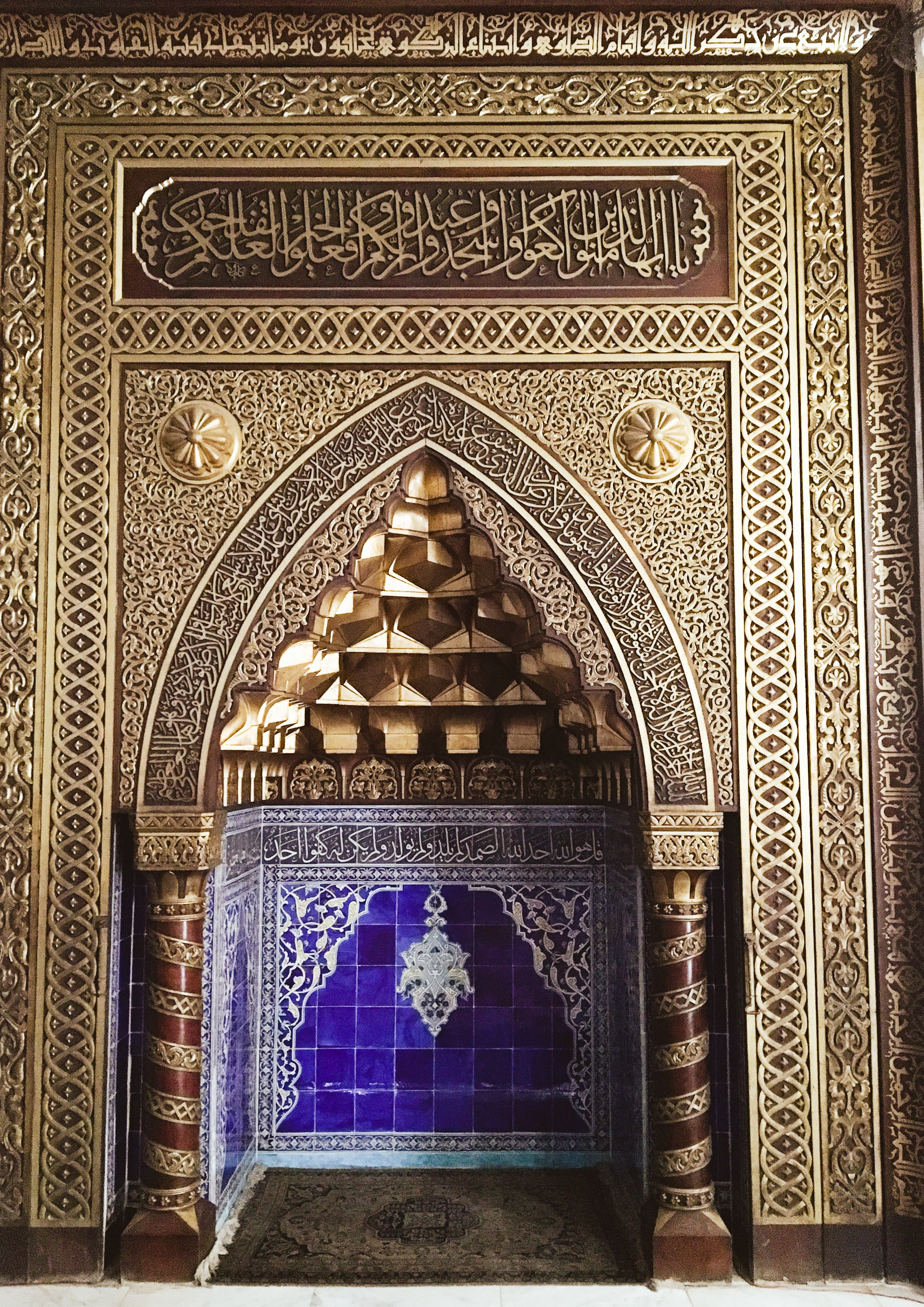
Mosque mihrab

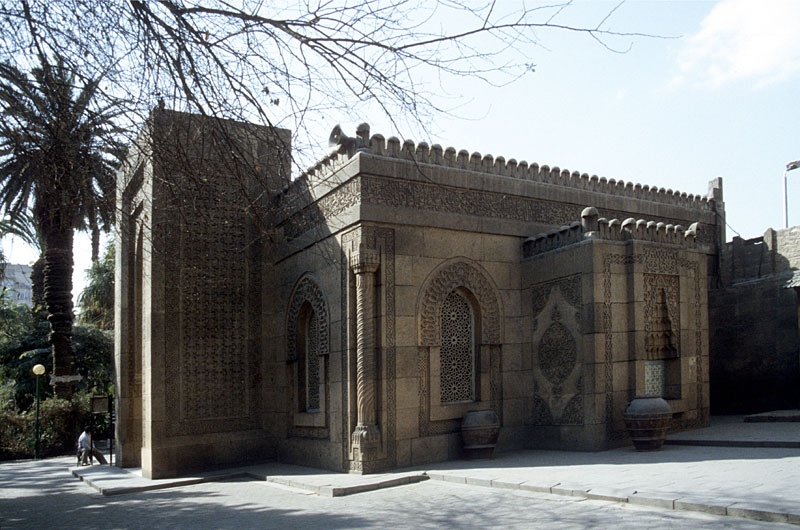
Mosque

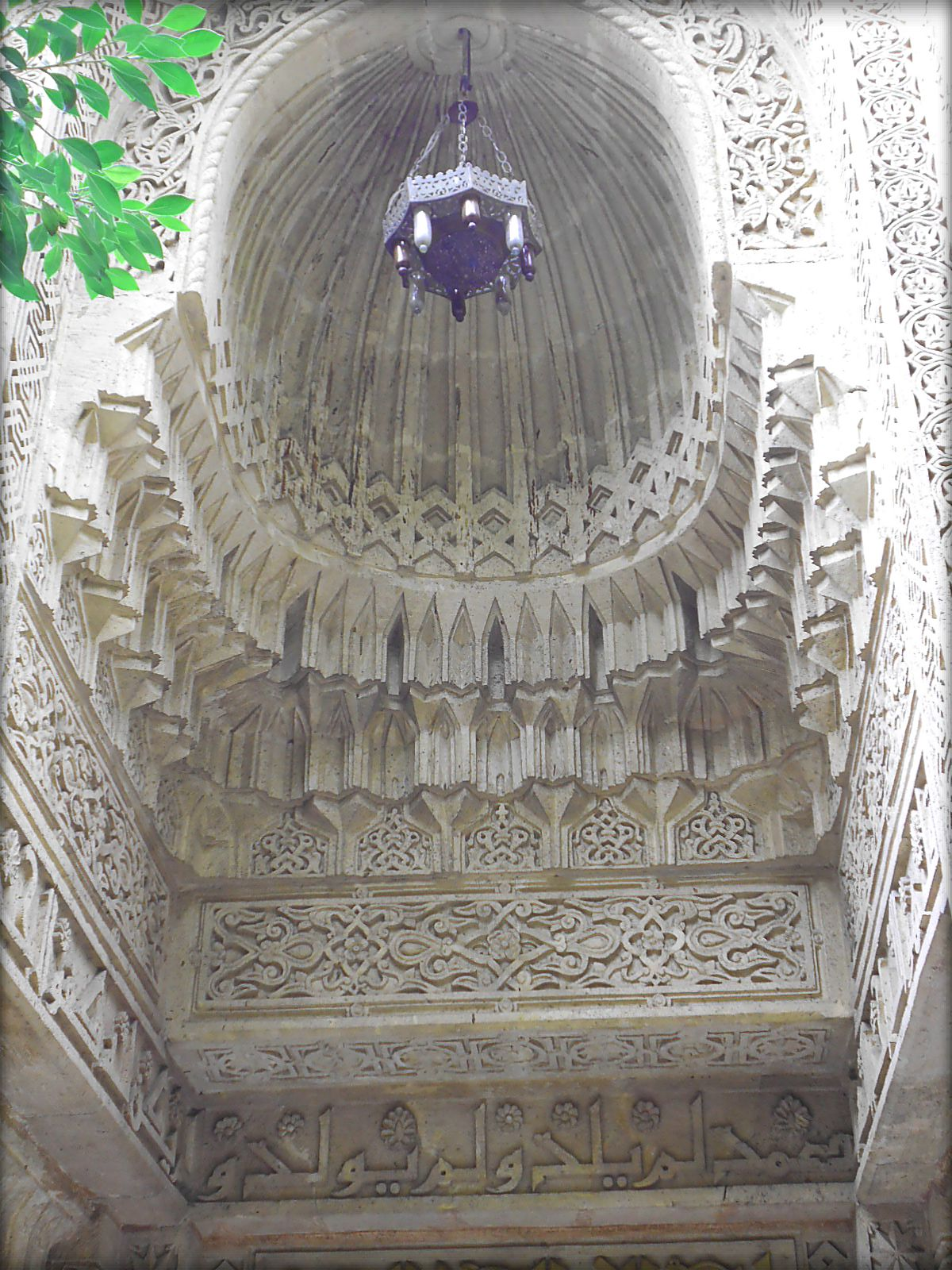
Mosque

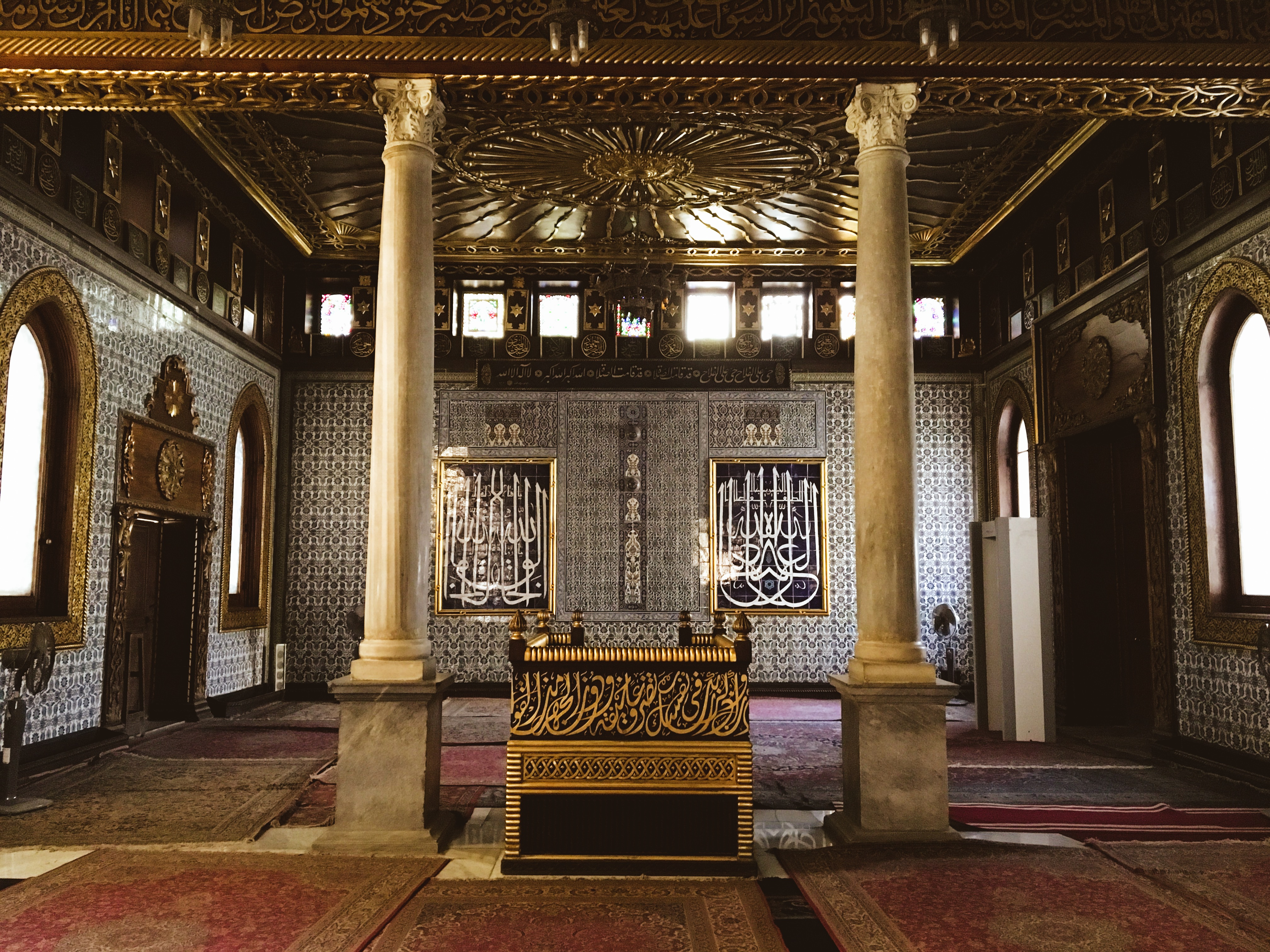
Mosque

== See also ==
- List of palaces in Egypt
- Tourism in Egypt
- El Safa Palace
- Muhammad Ali dynasty
- Old Cairo - adjacent historic district to east
