= Timeline of the Egyptian revolution of 2011 =

The following details a chronological summary of the 2011 Egyptian revolution from 25 January until Hosni Mubarak's resignation as president of Egypt on 11 February 2011.

Mubarak had served as president since 1981 and ruled under emergency law with his son Gamal appearing to be a likely successor for the presidency. In December 2010, protests in Tunisia sparked by the death of Mohamed Bouazizi coalesced into a revolution. The killing of Khaled Mohamed Saeed in June 2010 became a similar rallying point for activists in Egypt. Increasing use of social media among activists centered on plans for a nationwide protest on 25 January 2011.

Millions turned out in major cities across Egypt on the 25th, especially in Cairo's Tahrir Square. In the beginning, tensions were high between the police and protesters with violence breaking out in Suez and Alexandria. The government took a hard line, using riot-control tactics, and shutting down communications; But by the 28th the protests were continuing and the police had retreated. The security role was taken over by the military, and from then on the situation remained almost entirely peaceful. As pressure rose on Mubarak, the scale of the protests continued to grow, especially on specially organized Friday rallies.

Mubarak initially gave concessions, including the dissolution of parliament, agreeing to oversee a process of reform, and promising not to run for reelection in September 2011. The protesters, however, were not satisfied and by 8 February there were widespread calls for Mubarak's resignation. On the night of 10 February, Mubarak gave a speech in which it was expected he would step down. Anger erupted when he stated plans to merely delegate some of his power. By the next day, 11 February 2011, he had resigned.

== January 2011 ==
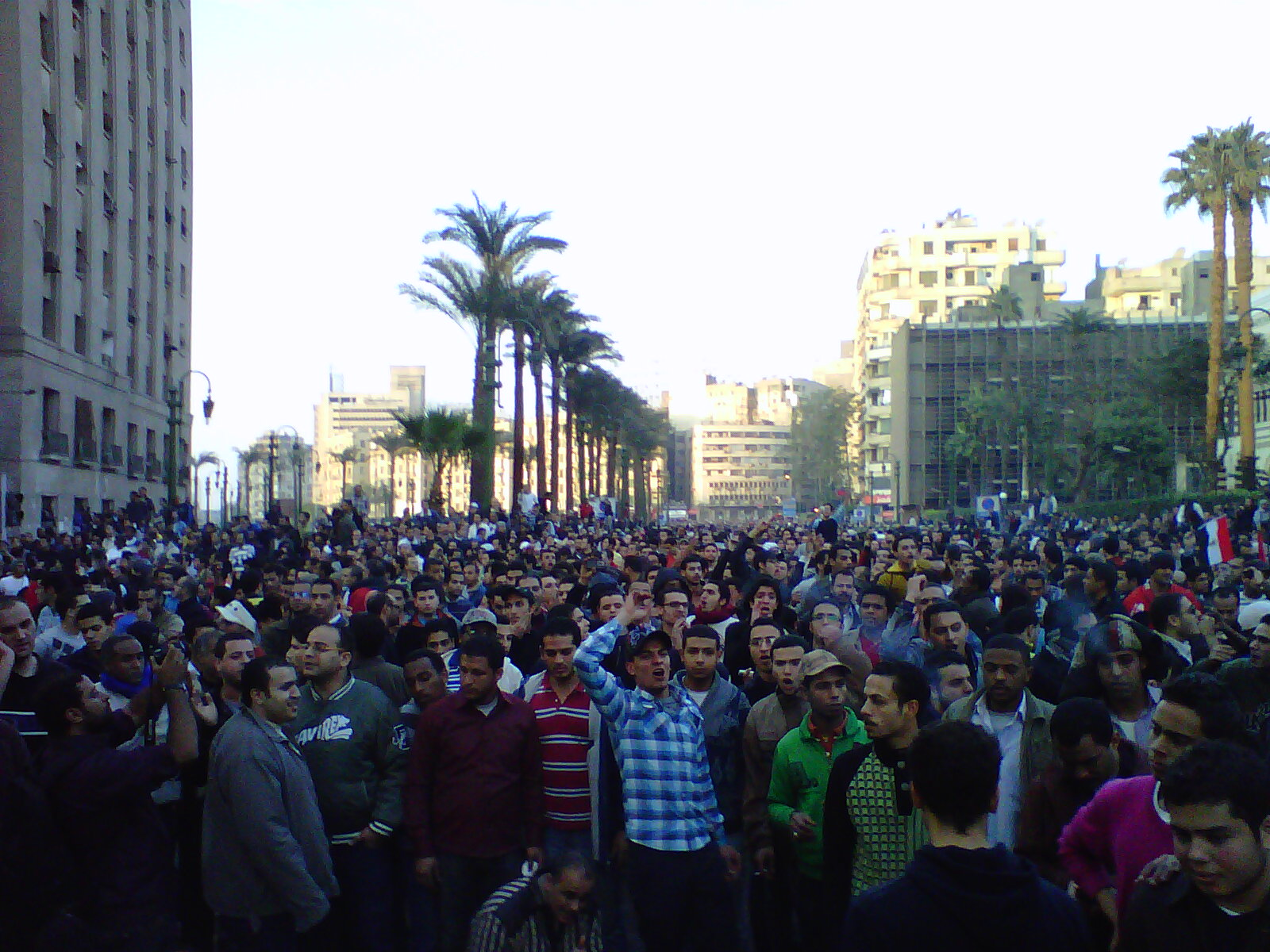
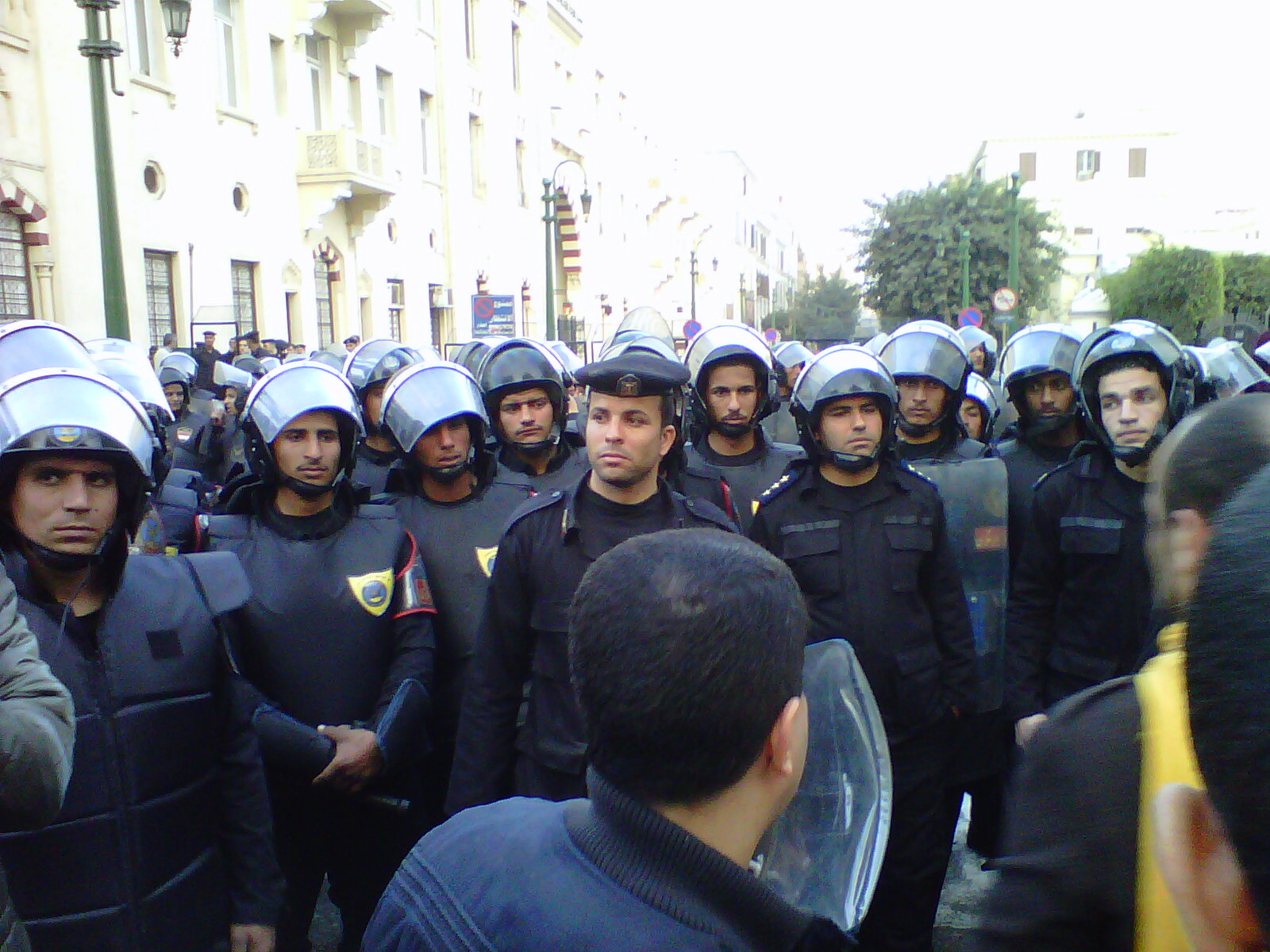
From left to right: Protesters marching to Tahrir Square, in Downtown Cairo, where the main protests were being held; and Paramilitary riot police of the Central Security Forces; 20000 to 30000 police were deployed in central Cairo.

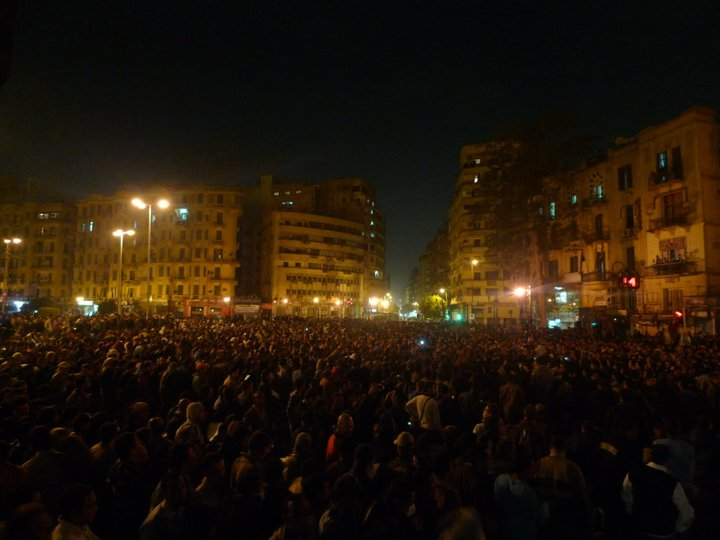
Tahrir Square on the evening of 25 January 2011

On 25 January 2011, known as the "Day of Anger" (Arabic: يوم الغضب yawm al-ġaḍab, Egyptian Arabic: [ˈjoːm elˈɣɑdɑb]) or the "Day of Revolt", protests took place in different cities across Egypt, including Cairo, Alexandria, Suez and Ismailia. The day was selected by many opposition groups such as the 6 April Youth Movement, We Are All Khaled Said Movement, National Association for Change, 25 January Movement and Kefaya to coincide with National Police Day. The purpose was to protest against abuses by the police in front of the Ministry of Interior. These demands expanded to include the resignation of the Minister of Interior, the restoration of a fair minimum wage, the end of Egyptian emergency law, and term limits for the president.

Protests took place in different locations in Egypt. 20,000 protested in various locations across Alexandria, 200 demonstrators in the southern city of Aswan, 2,000 in the eastern city of Ismaïlia, and about 3,000 in the northern city of El-Mahalla El-Kubra. Deadly clashes broke out during the protests leading to the death of two protesters in Suez.

Cairo protesters had gathered in the morning in front of the High Court in the centre of Cairo. The demonstration was larger than expected. It broke through the security cordon and moved to Tahrir Square. Thousands protested in Cairo, with 15,000 occupying Tahrir Square (Liberation Square). Police used tear gas and water cannons against the protesters, who in turn threw stones at police, eventually forcing them to retreat.

Hossam el-Hamalawy stated to Al-Jazeera during the evening of the protest that the demonstrations were "necessary to send a message to the Egyptian regime that Mubarak is no different than Ben Ali and we want him to leave too." He also told Al-Jazeera, "People are fed up of Mubarak and of his dictatorship and of his torture chambers and of his failed economic policies. If Mubarak is not overthrown tomorrow then it will be the day after. If it's not the day after it's going to be next week."

=== 26 January ===
On 26 January, riots continued with protesters' numbers continuing to rise. Violence by both protesters and police increased. One protester and one police official were killed in Cairo. Suez experienced an unexpected uprising; many protesters faced live rounds, and both protesters and police were beaten. Suez protesters set fire to several government buildings, including the police station.

=== 27 January ===
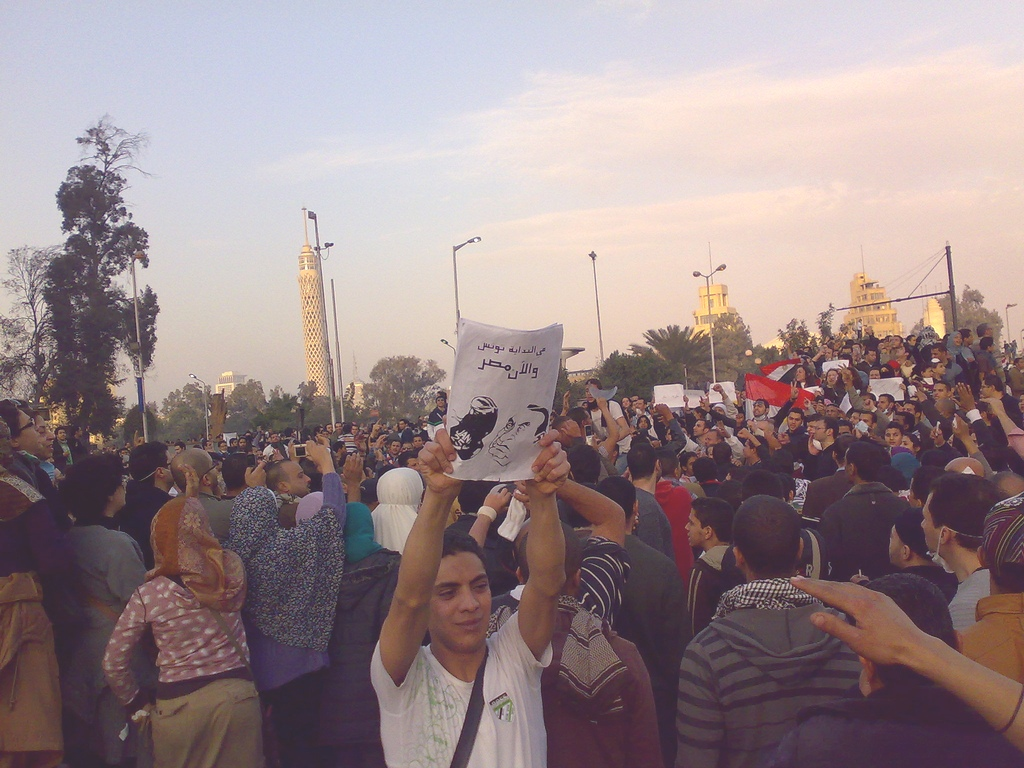
A demonstration in Cairo. The sign includes a caricature by Carlos Latuff which depicts Mubarak being shoed.

Protests were not as large on 27 January while preparations were made for planned large-scale events on the following day (Friday). The Muslim Brotherhood declared its full support of the protests, and members planned to take part during Friday's demonstrations. Leader of the National Association for Change and former head of the International Atomic Energy Agency Mohamed ElBaradei returned that day.

The people have broken the barrier of fear. There is no going back.

— Mohamed ElBaradei

Later in the day a protester of Bedouin descent was shot dead by police in the town of Sheikh Zoweid in the North Sinai region, raising the death toll to seven. In Suez, the uprising continued and violence increased as more buildings were set ablaze, including police posts. Some Suez and Sinai region protesters armed themselves with guns leading to violent conflicts.

Hundreds were arrested at the various protests. About 600 were arrested in Cairo, including 8 Egyptian journalists protesting against the government's reported restrictions on domestic and Middle Eastern affairs. More than 120 people were arrested in Asyut, mostly members of the Muslim Brotherhood.

The government shut down four major ISPs at approximately 5:20 p.m. EST. disrupting Internet and telephone traffic in the entire country except for Egypt's stock exchange and some government ministries served by the fifth ISP: Noor Group.

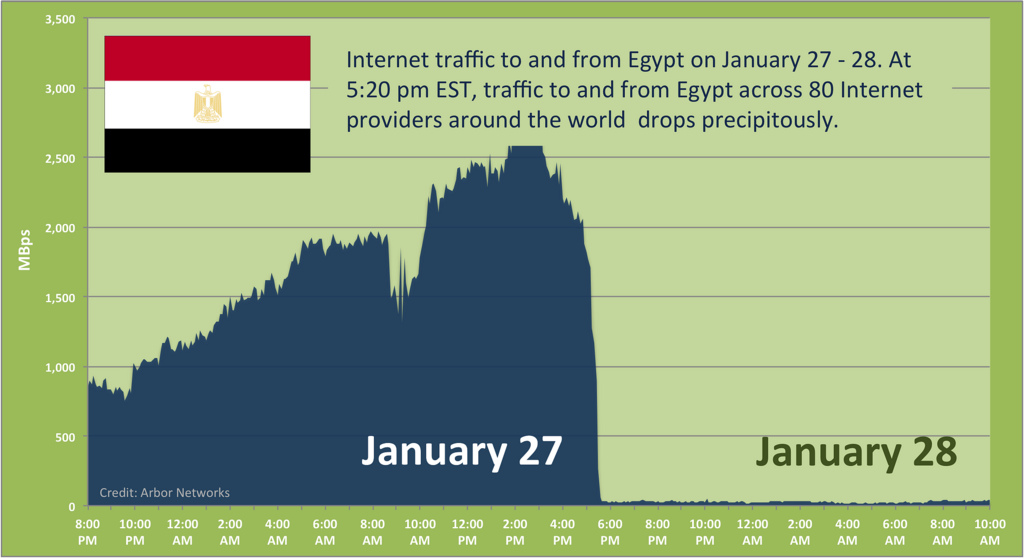
Internet traffic in Egypt before and during the domestic blackout

=== 28 January – Friday of Anger ===
An Al Jazeera report on the protests (in English)

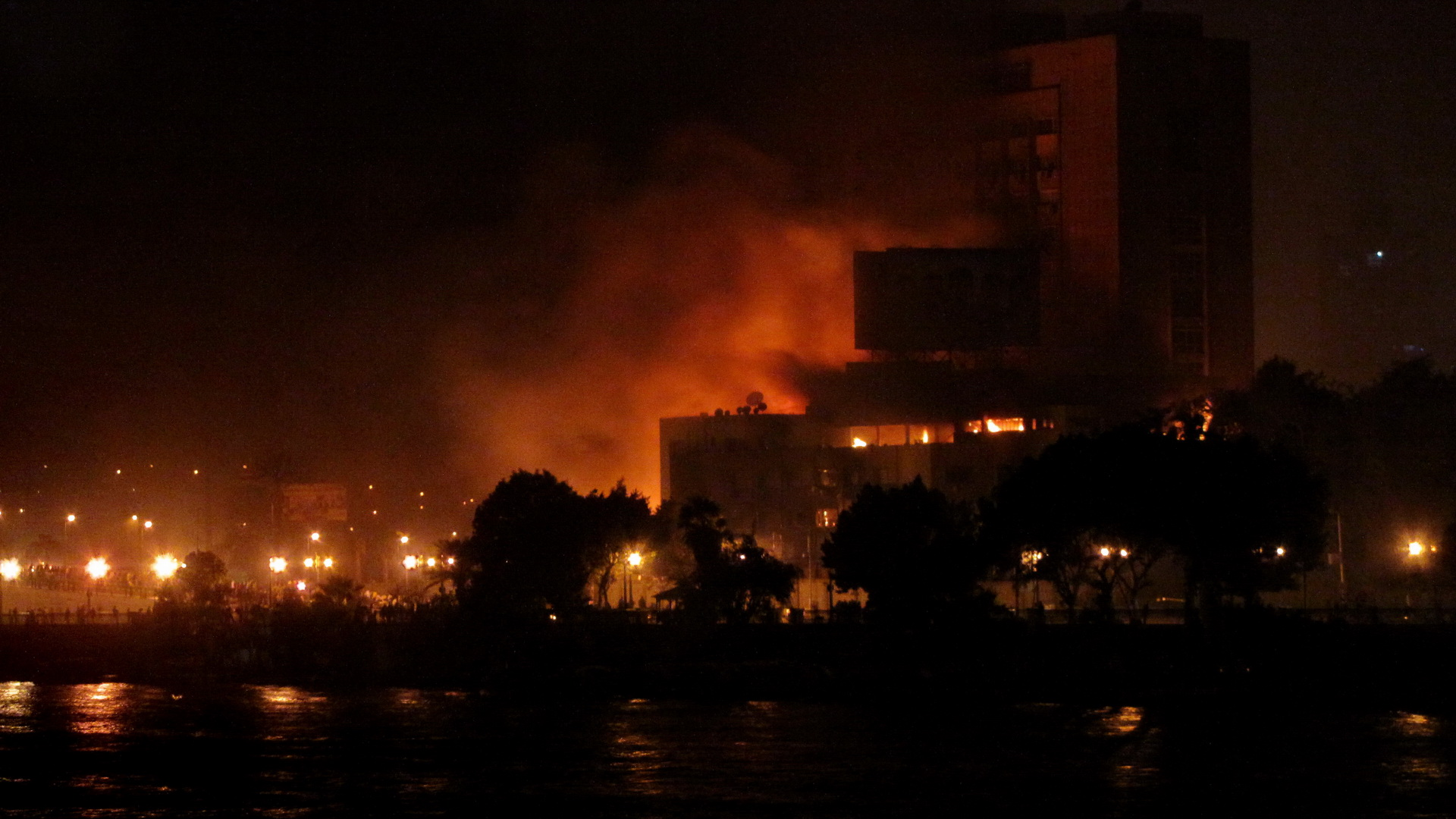
The main headquarters of the ruling National Democratic Party aflame during the Friday of Anger in Cairo

Tens of thousands filled the streets across Egypt on Friday, 28 January, called by some the "Friday of Anger" (Arabic: جمعة الغضب ǧumʿat al-ġaḍab Egyptian Arabic: [ˈɡomʕet elˈɣɑdɑb]) and by others as the "Day of Rage". Hours before the protests, the Egyptian government shut down Internet services, although some people communicated using a text-to-speech telephone service set up by Google and Twitter. Text messaging and mobile phone services also appeared to be blocked. According to Vodafone, all mobile operators in Egypt were instructed to suspend services in selected areas. The authorities had prior legislative approval to issue such an order.

Shortly after Jumu'ah (Friday prayers), tens of thousands of Egyptians assembled to protest; within hours the number rose to hundreds of thousands. ElBaradei arrived from Giza, where he had been leading protests, to Cairo. Ynetnews and CNN stated that ElBaradei was placed under arrest, while Al Jazeera English said that ElBaradei was unaware of his would-be house arrest. ElBaradei's detention prompted the U.S. to review its $1.5 billion aid package for Egypt; he was later released. Meanwhile, the Muslim Brotherhood said that twenty members of the banned group had been detained overnight, including Essam el-Erian, its main spokesman, and Mohamed Morsi, one of its leaders.

Throughout the day, police fired tear gas, rubber bullets, and water cannons into crowds during violent clashes between authorities and protesters throughout Egypt. In Port Said tens of thousands gathered and multiple government buildings were set ablaze. In Suez, police shot and killed at least one protester. Protesters in Suez took control of a police station, freed arrested protesters and then burned down a nearby smaller local police post. The government issued an 18:00 to 7:00 curfew, but protesters ignored it and were met by police. In the evening, one of the National Democratic Party (NDP) headquarters buildings in Cairo was set on fire by an unidentified culprit. While protesters paused for evening prayers, police continued firing tear gas. The day's defiance was summed up by the plethora of Tunisian national flags and anti-Mubarak graffiti that the protesters had created in the Greater Cairo region, Alexandria, Beni Suef, Mansoura and Manufiya.

Amid reports of looting, concerns were raised about the safety of the antiquities of the famous Egyptian Museum, near the epicenter of the Cairo protests. Egyptian state television announced in the evening that army commandos had secured the museum. Protesters joined soldiers in protecting the museum, situated beside the burning ruling party headquarters. Looters managed to enter during the night from the roof to damage a number of small artifacts, and it was initially reported that they had ripped the heads off two mummies, but subsequent reports claimed that Egypt's top archaeologist had mistaken skulls from other skeletons, and that the mummies were intact.

The arson and looting that took place throughout the day has been compared to the disorder that befell Cairo during the 1952 fire, also known as Black Saturday.

==== Deployment of the army ====
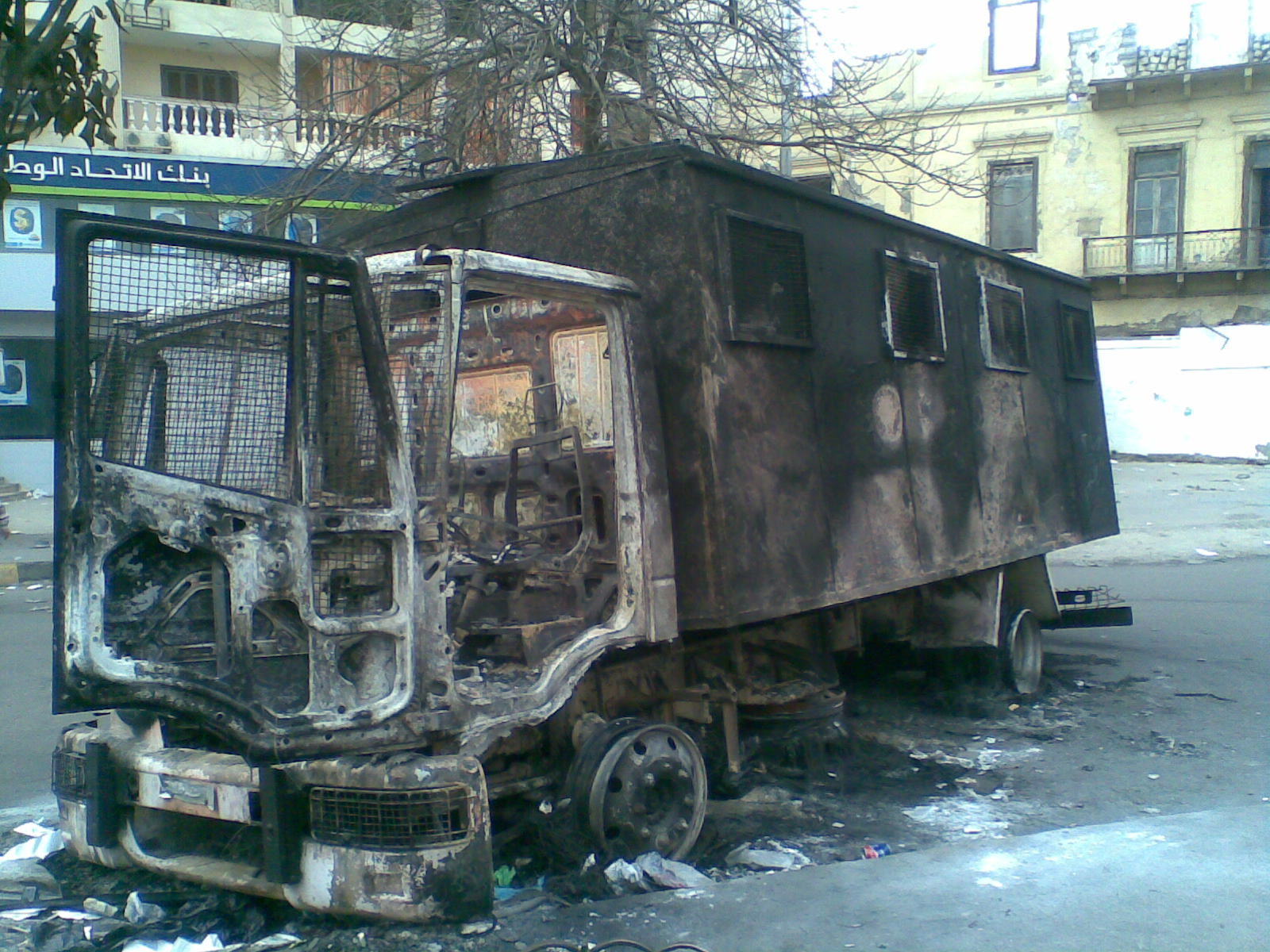
Police vehicle that was burned during the night of 28 January

A delegation led by the chief of staff of Egypt's armed forces, Lt. Gen. Sami Hafez Enan, was in Washington, D.C., although the visit was truncated due to the protests. The sessions, an annual country-to-country military coordination, were being led for the U.S. by Assistant Secretary of Defense for International Security Affairs Alexander Vershbow. A meeting with Adm. Mike Mullen, chairman of the U.S. Joint Chiefs of Staff, and other talks had been planned to extend to 2 February. However, in light of events in Egypt, the delegation left Washington to return home. Before their Friday night departure, Vershbow urged the two dozen representatives of the largely American-funded Egyptian military "to exercise 'restraint'".

Al Jazeera reported an Associated Press claim that an elite counter-terrorism force had been deployed at strategic points around Cairo, and that Egypt's interior ministry was warning of "decisive measures". The secretary-general of the ruling National Democratic Party, Safwat Sherif, held a press conference stating, "We hope that tomorrow's Friday prayers and its rituals happen in a quiet way that upholds the value of such rituals ... and that no one jeopardises the safety of citizens or subjects them to something they do not want."

The Egyptian government deployed military in Cairo, Alexandria, and Suez to assist the police. Al Jazeera reported that in Suez and in Alexandria the military wanted to avoid an open armed confrontation with protesters. In Giza, Protesters gathered in front of the l-Istiqama Mosque. where protesters and riot police fought in parts of Giza, including at the mosque.

=== 29 January ===
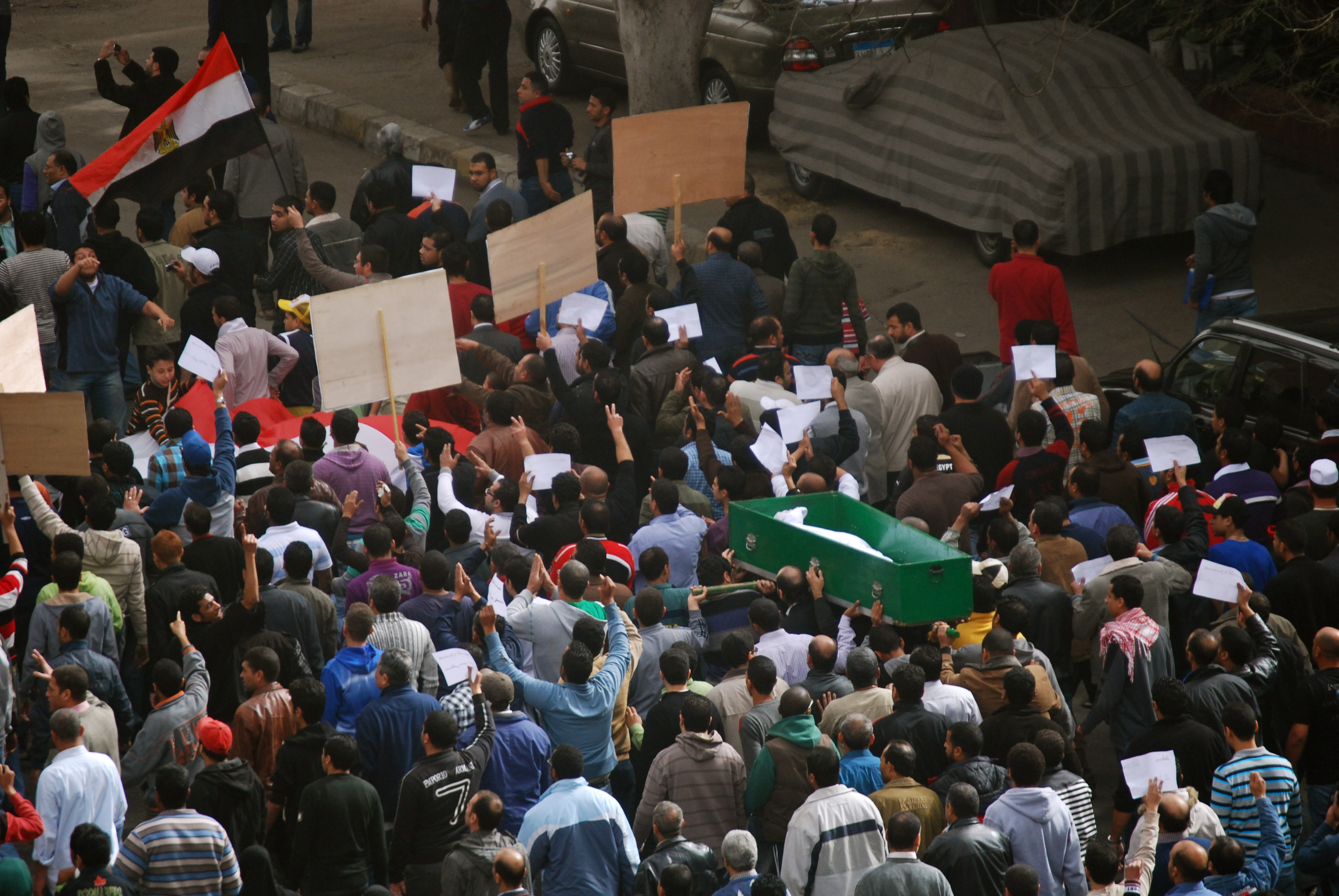
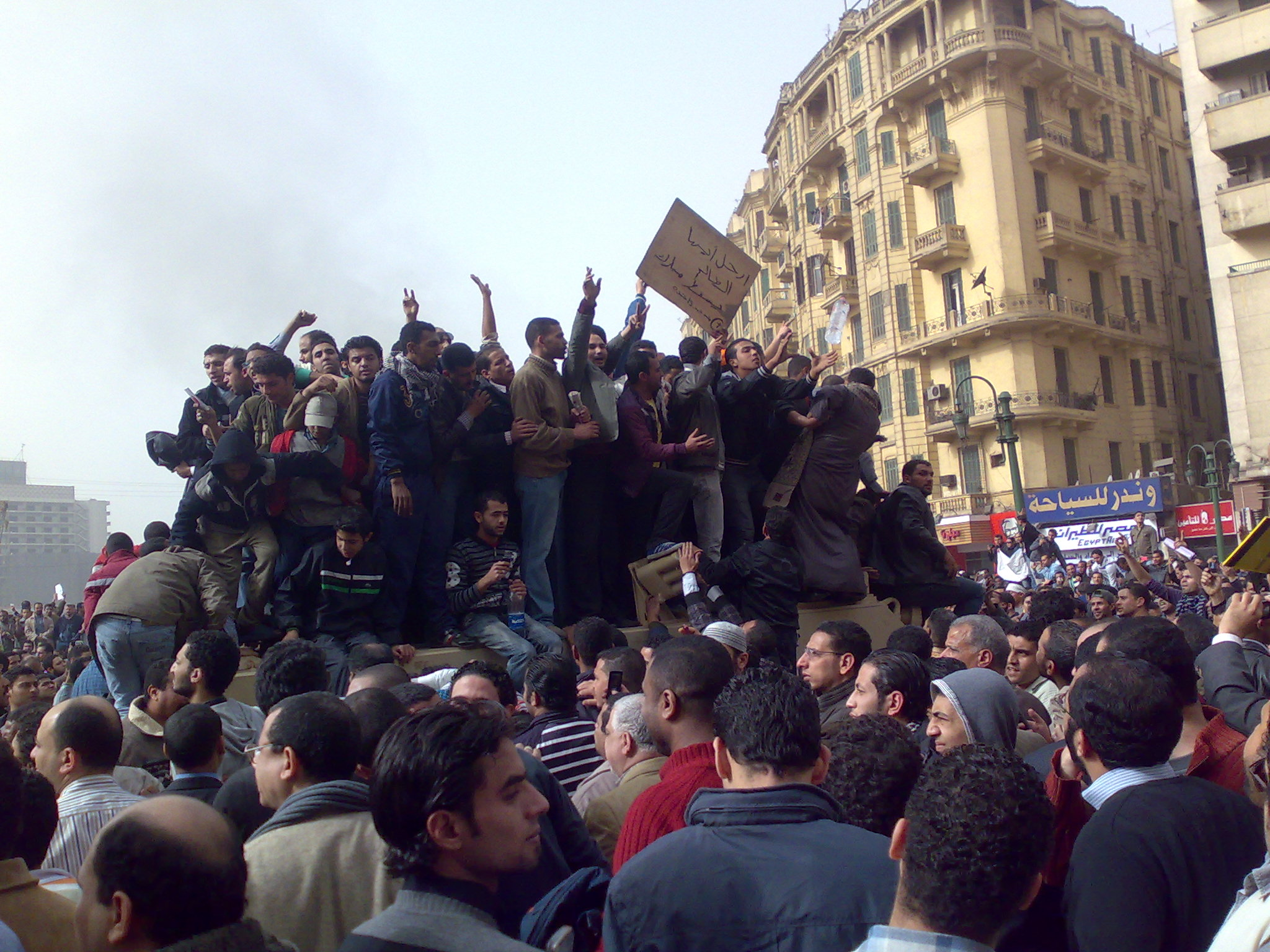
From left to right: Protesters in Cairo carrying a coffin; and Demonstrators standing on an army vehicle in Tahrir Square, Cairo. The sign reads: "Leave, you tyrant. Down with Mubarak."

The night of 28/29 January was quieter in Cairo with fewer reports of looting than in previous days.

Widespread protests continued, with many protesters chanting, "Down with Mubarak". Chants of "the people and the army are one" were also heard, as the position of the army in the course of events continued to be critical but ambiguous. By 2:00 pm local time, approximately 50,000 had gathered in Tahrir Square, 10,000 gathered in Kafr-al-Sheikh, and additional protests took place in other cities. A curfew was announced by the army for Cairo, Alexandria and Suez from 4–6 pm. The 6:00 pm police curfew the previous day had had "almost no effect whatsoever", according to Al Jazeera English, and protesters continued to descend on Tahrir Square. Protesters gathered at the Ministry of Interior, and three were killed by police when they tried to storm the building.

Protesters were described by reporters as more confident and even celebratory as they felt they were nearing their objective—the end of Mubarak's regime—although they had no tangible evidence of this.

In Beni Suef, south of Cairo, 17 protesters were killed by police as the protesters attempted to attack two police stations. In Abu Zaabal Prison in Cairo, eight people were killed as police clashed with inmates trying to escape. According to a Reuters tally, these unconfirmed deaths brought the death toll to at least 100. Several Islamist terrorists and others escaped. Prison overcrowding and police brutality were voiced by many of the protesters. Emad Gad, an analyst with the Al-Ahram Center for Political and Strategic Studies, said that he had obtained information from a trustworthy source that "there have been orders from the very top to free known felons from the prisons, to arm them and to let them mingle with protesters." Two Egyptian policemen jailed following the death of anti-corruption activist Khaled Said were among the hundreds of prisoners that escaped in Cairo that day.

Tanks were reported on the streets of Suez. A police station was torched after protesters seized weapons stored inside before telling officers to get out. At first there was a presence of the Central Security Force, then army troops who were ordered into major cities to quell street fighting. In the Sinai town of Rafah a lynch mob killed three police officers.

Many tourists sites were disrupted and the access to the Pyramids was suspended. The resort town of Sharm-el Shaikh, however, remained calm. Chaos was reported at Cairo International Airport, where thousands of stranded and frightened foreigners attempted to evacuate.

=== 30 January ===
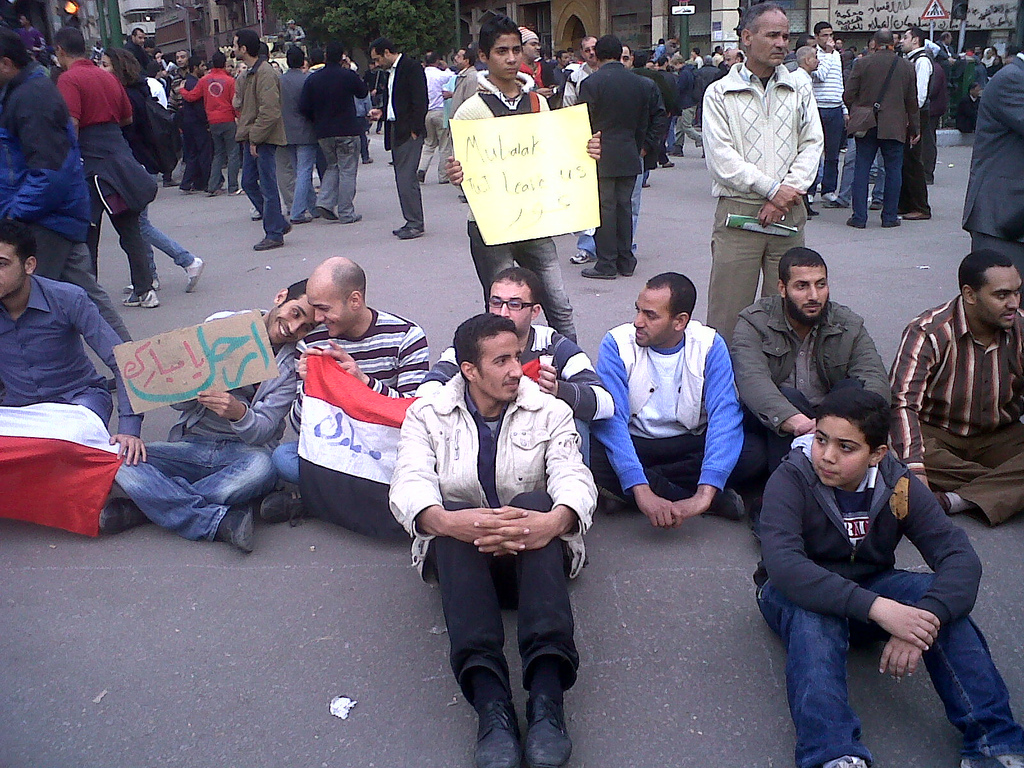
Protesters in Tahrir Square. Translation reads "Go away Mubarak"

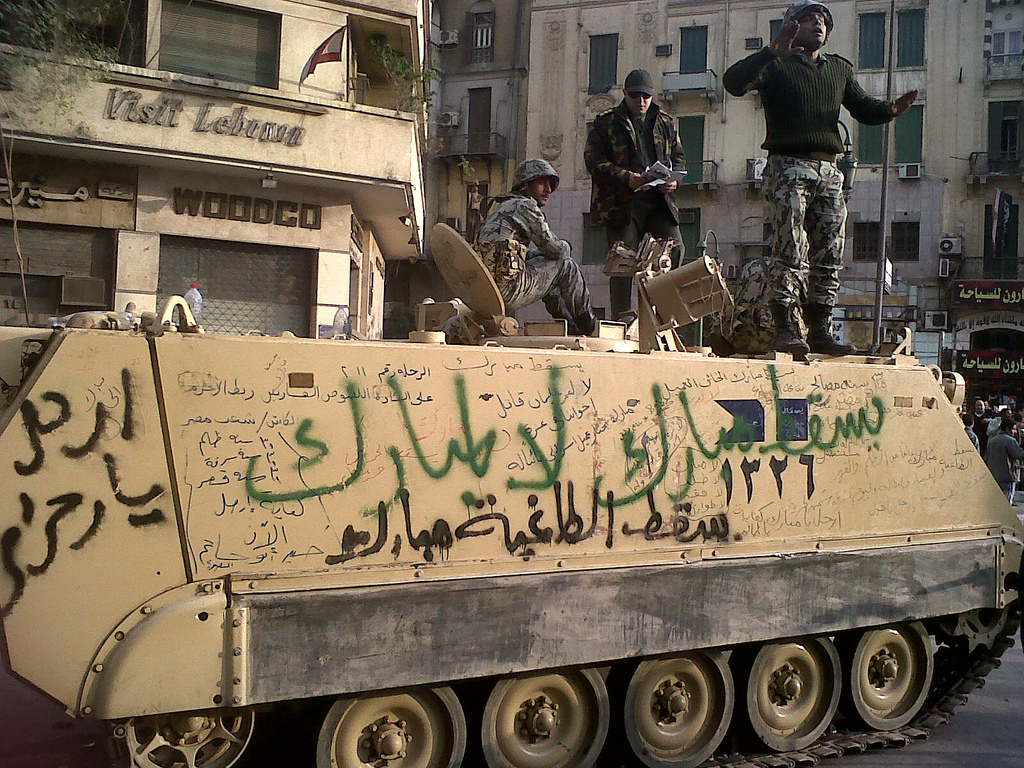
A troop carrier defaced with protester graffiti, the larger of which reads "Down with Mubarak", "No to Mubarak", "Mubarak the dictator has fallen", "30 years of theft and injustice ... enough is enough ... get out now!", "Leave, you thief!"'.

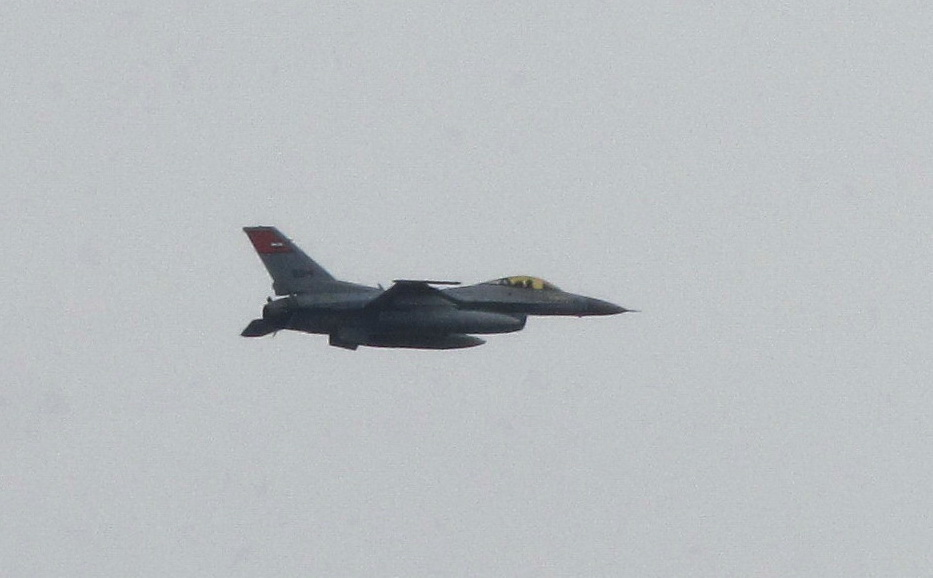
One of two Egyptian Air Force F-16s that flew over Cairo during the military's show of strength on 30 January

Overnight, thousands of protesters continued to defy the curfew and, as the night progressed, troops and armoured vehicles deployed across Cairo to guard key places such as train stations, major government buildings and banks. The army had insufficient capacity to patrol neighbourhoods, so residents set up armed vigilante groups to drive off looters and robbers. A heavy army presence (though no police) was reported in Suez. Chaos was rampant in Suez during the night, but as day broke the streets remained relatively quiet. As in Cairo, many residents formed vigilante groups to protect their homes and businesses in the absence of police. The military set up numerous checkpoints throughout the city. An estimation of about 30 bodies including the bodies of two children were taken to El Demerdash Hospital in central Cairo. By 6:00 am local time, Tahrir Square was quiet, with only a few hundred people. Later in the morning, 3–5,000 protesters were reported as gathering there, including hundreds of state judges protesting for the first time.

The National Association for Change, along with the April 6 Youth Movement, "We are all Khaled Said", the Jan 25 Movement and Kefaya (the main organizers of the protests) gave their support to ElBaradei to negotiate the formation of a temporary national unity government. They called for a new constitution and a transitional government. The Muslim Brotherhood (MB), reiterated demands for Mubarak's resignation. The MB also said, after protests turned violent, that it was time for the military to intervene. Al Jazeera reported that 34 members of the Muslim Brotherhood were released from custody as their guards abandoned their posts.

Mohamed Hussein Tantawi, Egypt's Minister of Defence and Commander in Chief of the Egyptian Armed Forces, was seen with the protesters in Tahrir Square in downtown Cairo. As of 18:30, ElBaradei had arrived in Tahrir Square and announced that "what we have begun cannot go back". He also said "You are the owners of this revolution. You are the future. Our key demand is the departure of the regime and the beginning of a new Egypt in which each Egyptian lives in virtue, freedom and dignity." Egyptian opposition leaders said that talks would be held only with the army. Mubarak was holding a meeting with his military commanders at the time.

Soldiers were then ordered to use live ammunition, but the army refused the order since it was present to "protect the people". The army chief told protesters they would not be fired upon. Helicopters monitored the protests, and fighter jets repeatedly flew low over Tahrir Square. After the first pass of the two Egyptian Air Force F-16s, the crowd cheered and subsequent passes triggered louder chants, laughing, and waving. The crowd did not disperse. Protesters were also reported picking up garbage in Tahrir Square, as essential services were not working and that they wanted to "keep our country clean". Food and water were offered at the scene by Egyptian people to the Egyptian protesters in sign of solidarity with the protesters.

Mubarak asked the current aviation minister and former chief of Air Staff Ahmed Shafiq, to form a new government. Shafiq, a Mubarak loyalist, had often been mentioned as a potential successor to Mubarak due to his politically reliable nature.

The Egyptian Central Bank said all banks and the stock market would remain closed on 30 January. Police returned to the streets at about 10:30 pm except at Tahrir Square. By 10:55 local time, Al Jazeera's offices in Cairo were ordered to close. At the same time, all correspondents for the network had their credentials revoked.

On the night of 30 January Mubarak's Sharm el-Sheikh holiday villa was guarded by a small force of armed and loyal police who turned away all approaching vehicles. Sharm el-Sheikh had seen no deaths and minimal trouble. Military aircraft were visible from the local airport's perimeter fence, although the airport was frequently used by the armed forces for operations. It was also one of the hubs for private air travel in and around Egypt, but most light aircraft had departed earlier that day.

=== 31 January ===
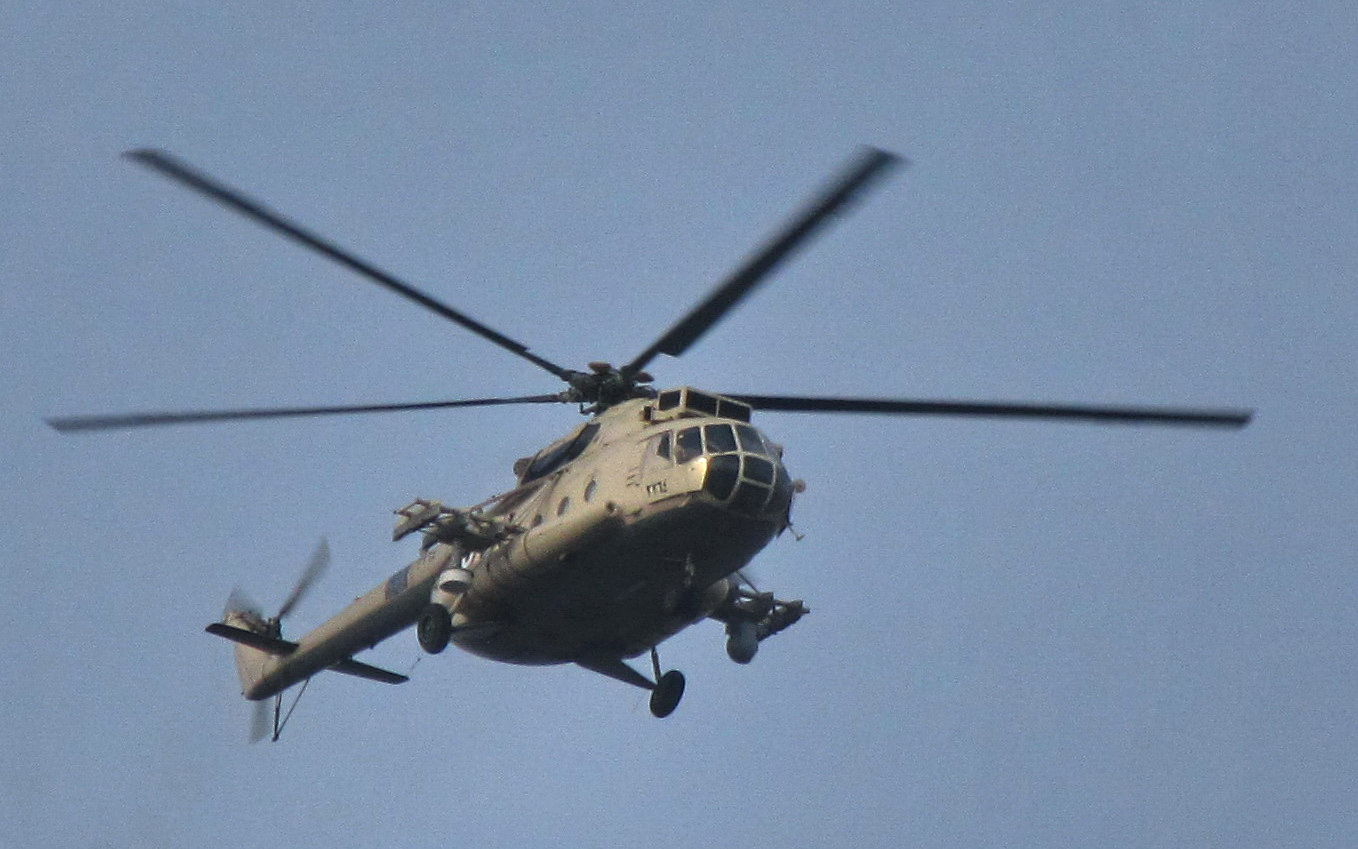
An Egyptian Air Force Mi-17 circling over Tahrir Square

The night of 30 to 31 January was quieter in Cairo, with fewer reports of looting. For the fourth day in a row the curfew was violated without repercussions. Security officials had announced that the curfew would start at 3:00 pm and threatened to shoot anyone who ignored it, although eventually little or no action was taken as security and army personnel left Tahrir Square.

Hundreds of thousands continued to protest in Egyptian cities, including 250,000 protesters in Cairo alone. A protester was shot dead in Abu Simbel and extra troops were moved to guard the Suez Canal. For the first time during protests, there were pro-Mubarak protests of at least 1,000 people. Mohamed ElBaradei again joined thousands of protesters in Tahrir Square. The National Association for Change, an umbrella group that contains several opposition movements including the Muslim Brotherhood and pro-democracy groups, chose ElBaradei to negotiate with Mubarak. Luis Ayala, the secretary-general of the Socialist International said that the NDP was expelled because:

The use of violence, with scores dead and injured, is totally incompatible with the policies and principles of any social democratic party anywhere in the world. Consequently, we consider that a party in government that does not listen, that does not move and that does not immediately initiate a process of meaningful change in these circumstances, cannot be a member of the Socialist International. We are, as of today, ceasing the membership of the NDP, however we remain determined to cooperate with all the democrats in Egypt striving to achieve an open, democratic, inclusive and secular state.

Industrial strikes were also called in many cities, including Cairo. Nissan had suspended production at its plant in Egypt to ensure employees' safety after anti-government protests, but Hyundai's plant chose to continue working.

Reports emerged of several major prisons across the country being attacked, and law and order rapidly deteriorated across most of Egypt. Criminal violence continued in Cairo as looters burnt out the Arkadia shopping mall. Egypt Air cancelled all internal and outbound flights; an inbound Egypt Air flight from London to Cairo was diverted to Athens because of an alleged bomb threat. Once policing became more problematic due to police disappearing from Cairo, the military took over, creating an overall more rigid system and making the military position more critical. Senior Egyptian generals led by Tantawi released a statement saying:

The armed forces will not resort to use of force against our great people. Your armed forces, who are aware of the legitimacy of your demands and are keen to assume their responsibility in protecting the nation and the citizens, affirms that freedom of expression through peaceful means is guaranteed to everybody.

Zahi Hawass, an internationally known archeologist, was appointed by Mubarak to the newly created cabinet post of Minister of Antiquities during the cabinet shakeup on 31 January. Hawass said in a statement published on his personal blog that "the broken objects can all be restored, and we will begin the restoration process this week". In a New York Times interview he rejected comparisons with Iraq and Afghanistan and said that antiquities were being safeguarded.

== February 2011 ==
=== 1 February – March of the Millions ===
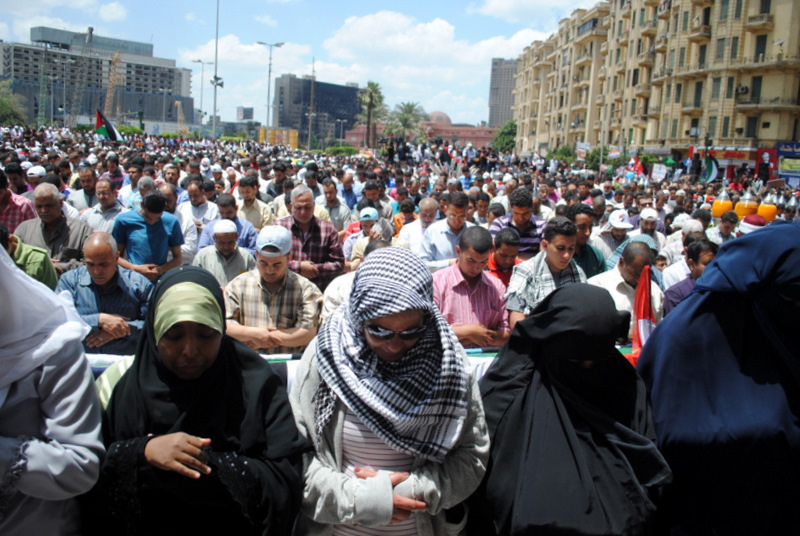
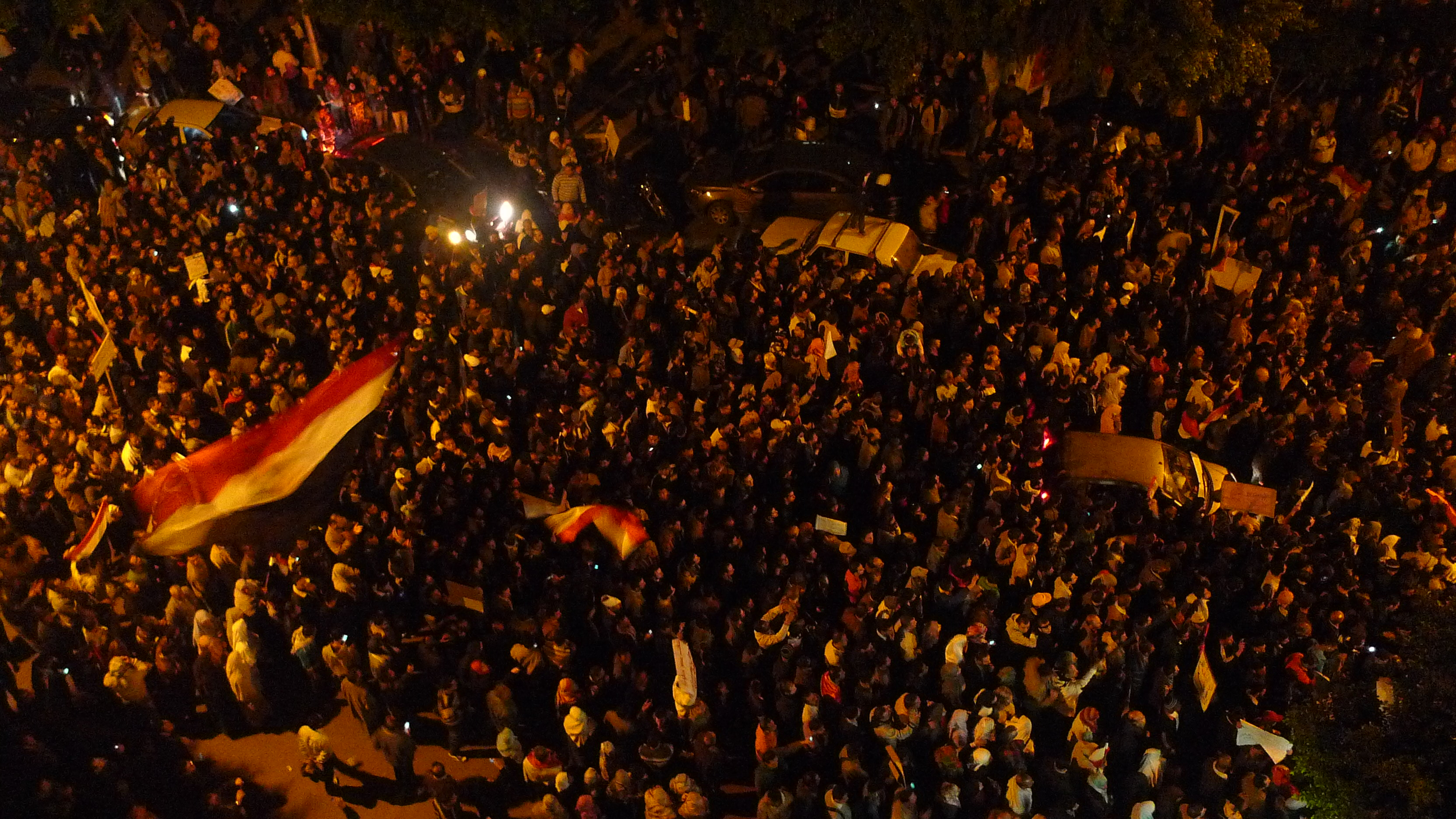
From left to right: Demonstrators in Tahrir Square during prayer; Demonstrators in Sidi Gaber, Alexandria

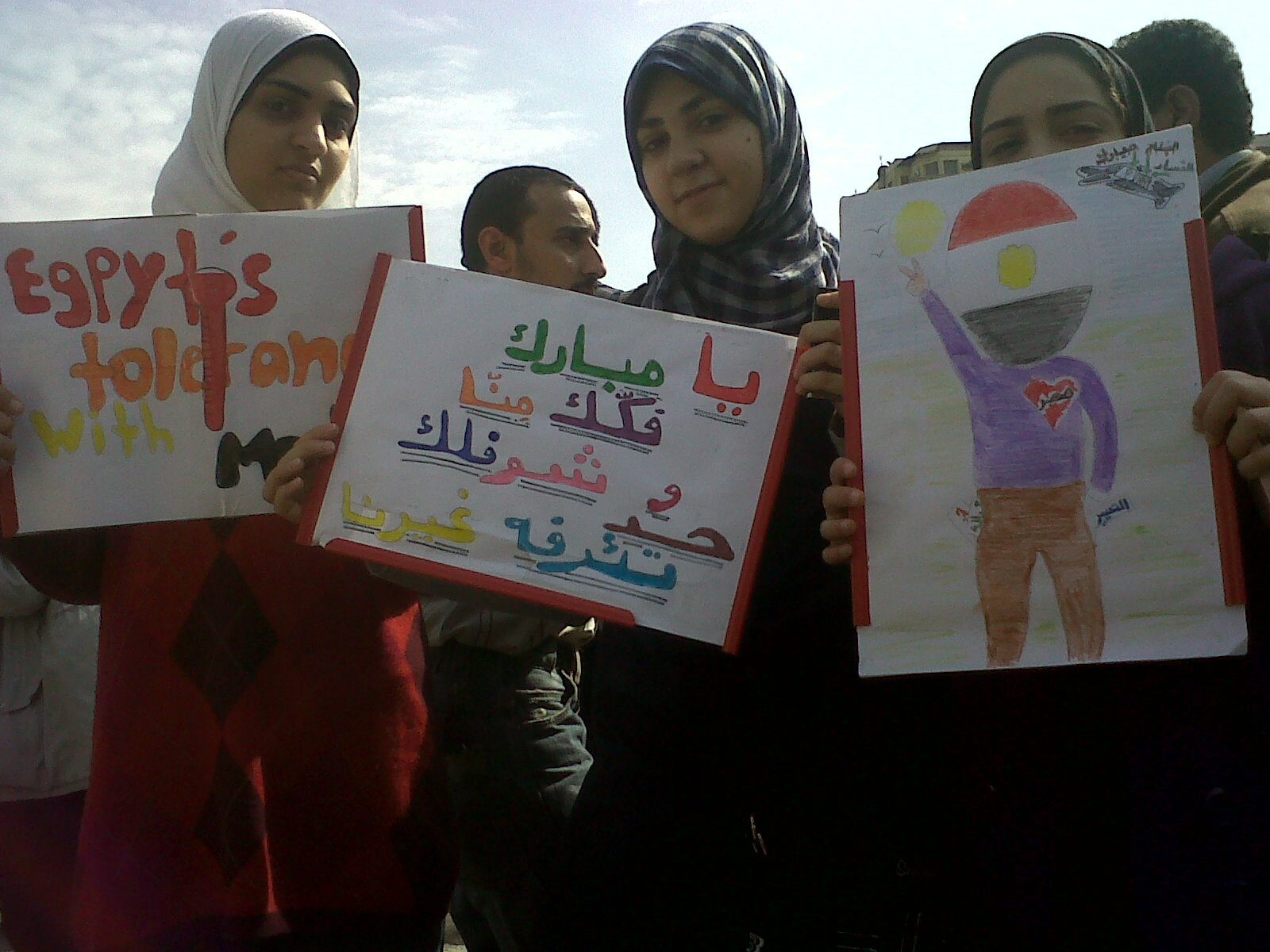
Young protesters in Cairo. The middle sign reads: "Mubarak leave us and go look for someone else to gross out other than us."

Opposition leaders called for a "March of the Millions", from the Arabic مسيرة مليونية masīrat milyōna) from Cairo's Tahrir Square to the Presidential Palace in Heliopolis on 1 February. Egyptian security forces fortified Mubarak's presidential palace with coils of barbed wire to ensure no demonstrators could break into the palace.

According to the Egyptian government media, the number of protesters in Cairo was reported to be thousands. The BBC reported the number of protesters in Tahrir Square ranged from "more than 100,000 to some 250,000—the square's maximum capacity." Egyptian security forces stated that 500,000 people participated in the protests in Cairo alone. According to Al Jazeera, over one million protesters gathered in central Cairo, but other analyses suggested that such estimates might have been overstated. A crowd-size analysis based on Tahrir Square's physical dimensions and density pointed to smaller numbers, suggesting a maximum capacity of 200,000 to 250,000 individuals within the square and surrounding areas.

Similar protests occurred across Egypt with hundreds of thousands in Alexandria, and an estimated 250,000 in Sinai and Suez marking the largest mobilisation in the then eight-day-old protest. Meanwhile, a virtual "March of Millions" was launched on Facebook with the goal of reaching one million voices in support of the march. The event gathered 833,000 online supporters.

Vice President Suleiman held a meeting with some of the Muslim Brotherhood figures, including Mohamed Morsi and Saad El-Katatny. In the meeting Suleiman asked them to withdraw the MB youth from Tahrir so the situation would cool down and in return the Muslim Brotherhood would gain legitimacy by obtaining an actual license for a political party plus releasing some of its members including Khairat El-Shater.

In the late evening (11:00 PM local Egyptian time) President Mubarak proclaimed that he did not intend to run in the next election. Mubarak said he would stay in office to ensure a peaceful transition to the next election, set for September 2011, and promised to make political reforms. He also said that he would demand that Egyptian authorities pursue "outlaws" and "investigate those who caused the security disarray." Mubarak said that peaceful protests were transformed into "unfortunate clashes, mobilised and controlled by political forces that wanted to escalate and worsen the situation". He called upon the Egyptian parliament to change the term limits of the presidency and to change the requirements to run for president. He also admitted that there were voting violations by key members of the parliament, which would have led to removing those who were in rigged positions through the legal process.

In his speech on 1 February 2011 he said:

This dear nation ... is where I lived, I fought for it and defended its soil, sovereignty and interests. On its soil I will die. History will judge me like it did others.

Crowds continued protesting in Tahrir Square, demanding that the president step down. There were reports that Mubarak's proclamation came after President Barack Obama's special envoy, Frank G. Wisner, told Mubarak the U.S. saw his presidency at an end and urged him to prepare for an orderly transition to real democracy. In the past, Mubarak had said he would continue to serve Egypt until his last breath.

The United Nations human rights chief Navi Pillay announced that there were reports that more than 300 people had died in the violence with up to 3,000 injured, although stressed that these reports remain unconfirmed. Meanwhile, banks remained closed, making it difficult for people to obtain money to buy food; for those that have money, prices skyrocketed as consumers flood the few open stores. Recep Tayyip Erdogan, Turkey's Prime Minister, urged Mubarak to meet his people's "desire for change".

=== 2 February – Camel Battle ===
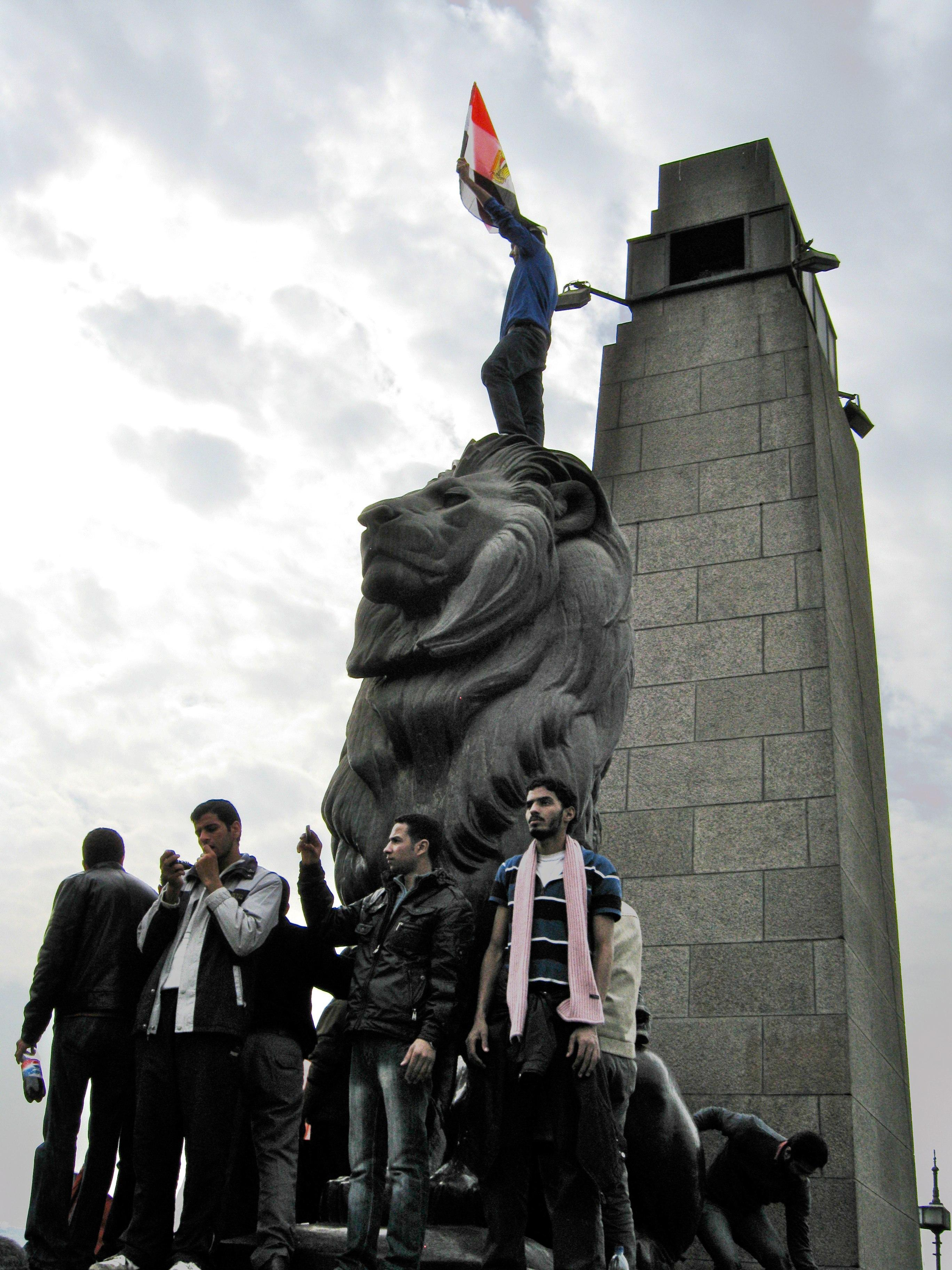
Protesters in Cairo next to Tahrir Square

During the night of 1–2 February, Mubarak supporters and protesters clashed in Alexandria, where shots were reportedly fired into the air. In Cairo, many protesters from the previous day had remained in Tahrir Square overnight.

In the morning, Internet access had been partially restored and the night-time curfew was eased, running from 5:00 pm to 7:00 am instead of 3:00 PM to 8:00 AM. By midday, the army was asking protesters to go home in order to stabilise the situation. State television then announced: "You have to evacuate Tahrir Square immediately. We've got confirmed information that violent groups are heading toward Tahrir Square carrying firebombs and seeking to burn the Square."

The NDP sent many people to show support for Mubarak. Baltagiya on horses and camels armed with swords, whips, clubs, stones, rocks, and pocket knives, attacked anti-government protesters in central Cairo, including Tahrir Square in what was later known as the (Battle of Jamal or Battle of the Camel) (Arabic: موقعة الجمل). Security officials were witnessed bribing ordinary citizens into attacking protesters. Some pro-Mubarak supporters were reportedly off-duty and undercover police, carrying police IDs. Gunfire was reported to be heard in Tahrir Square.

Molotov cocktails were also used on protesters, some landing on the grounds of the Egyptian Museum. Pro-Mubarak supporters were filmed dropping stones and firebombs from buildings onto demonstrators. Five were reported killed and 836 were taken to hospitals according to the Health Minister. There were also clashes in Alexandria and unrest in Port Said. Shadi Hamid, a Brookings Institution analyst based in Qatar, suggested a strategy of "hired muscle" had repeatedly been employed in the past by the Mubarak government, suggesting the same approach was possible. The Interior Ministry denied that this was being done. Some journalists were attacked by the pro-Mubarak supporters.

ElBaradei called on the army to intervene. He also said Mubarak should be given a "safe exit" for Friday's "Departure Day." and that "Today's violence is again an indication of a criminal regime that has lost any common sense. When the regime tries to counter a peaceful demonstration by using thugs ... there are few words that do justice to this villainy and I think it can only hasten that regime's departure." A coalition of opposition parties agreed to hold talks with the newly formed government. However, ElBaradei and the Muslim Brotherhood stressed they would not talk to any government representative, including Vice President Omar Suleiman, until Mubarak's resignation.

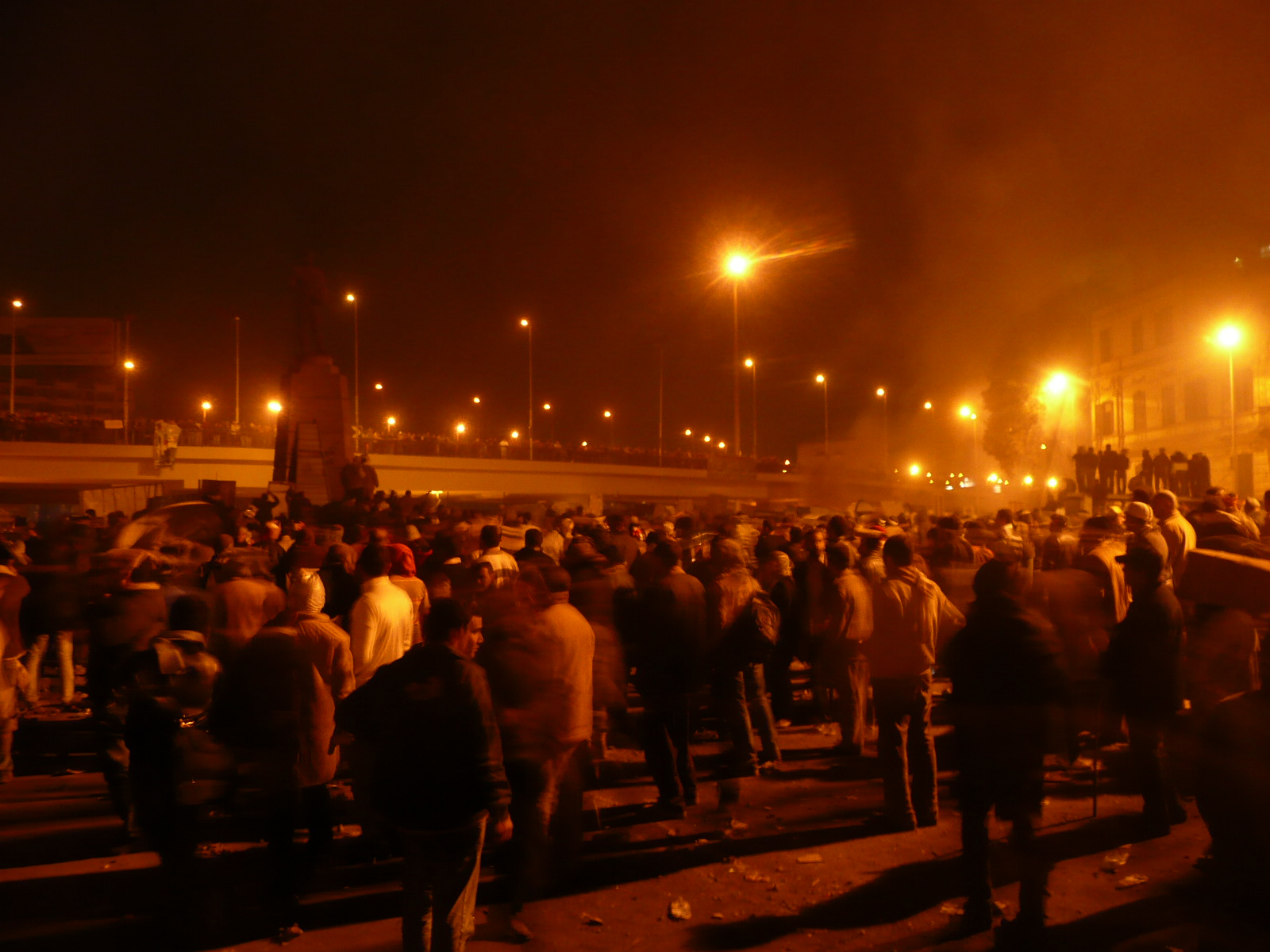
From left to right: Camels in Tahrir Square; and Battle of Tahrir Square during the evening of 2 February 2011

Ali Gomaa, the Grand Mufti of Egypt, said: "I greet President Mubarak who offered dialogue and responded to the demands of the people. Going against legitimacy is Haram (forbidden). This is an invitation for chaos. We support stability. What we have now is a blind chaos leading to a civil war. I call on all parents to ask their children to stay home." A former general who was a part of the intelligence services said that Mubarak would have no qualms about "setting the whole country on fire." Western media suggested the possibility of civil war as violence between the two sides escalated, leaving over a thousand injured.

==== Foreign response ====
UN Secretary General Ban Ki-moon condemned the violence and reiterated calls for reform, while EU foreign policy chief Catherine Ashton said that the violence must stop and that Mubarak needed to explicitly describe proposed changes.

UK Prime Minister David Cameron and the White House condemned the violence, and the US State Department called for restraint. US President Obama also said that the transition "must be meaningful, it must be peaceful and it must begin now". German Foreign Minister Guido Westerwelle and French President Nicolas Sarkozy asserted the right to march peacefully, while Erdogan called for democratisation. Israeli Prime Minister Benjamin Netanyahu expressed concern over a new government saying: "I am convinced that the forces that want to bring change and democratization in Egypt will also enhance peace between Israel and the Arab world. But we are not there yet. The struggle has not been decided ... We need to do everything to make sure that peace endures."

Mubarak rejected international calls to step aside. Finance Minister Samir Radwan said the government would be "open to discussion with all shades of political opinions". The army had earlier broadcast a message on television: ... You began by going out to express your demands and you are the ones capable of restoring normal life.

=== 3 February ===
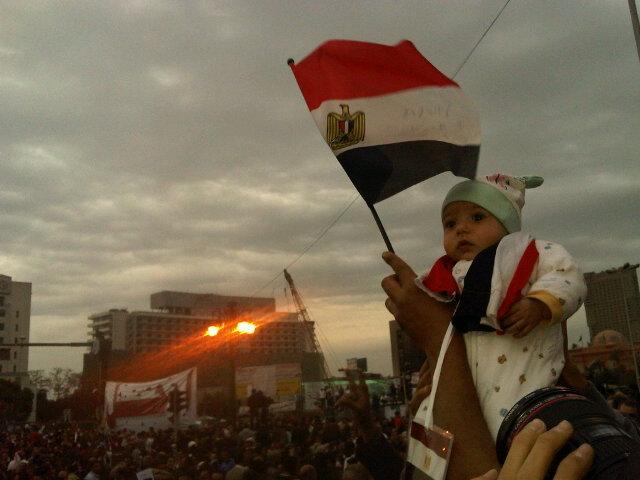
A baby waving the flag of Egypt in Tahrir Square

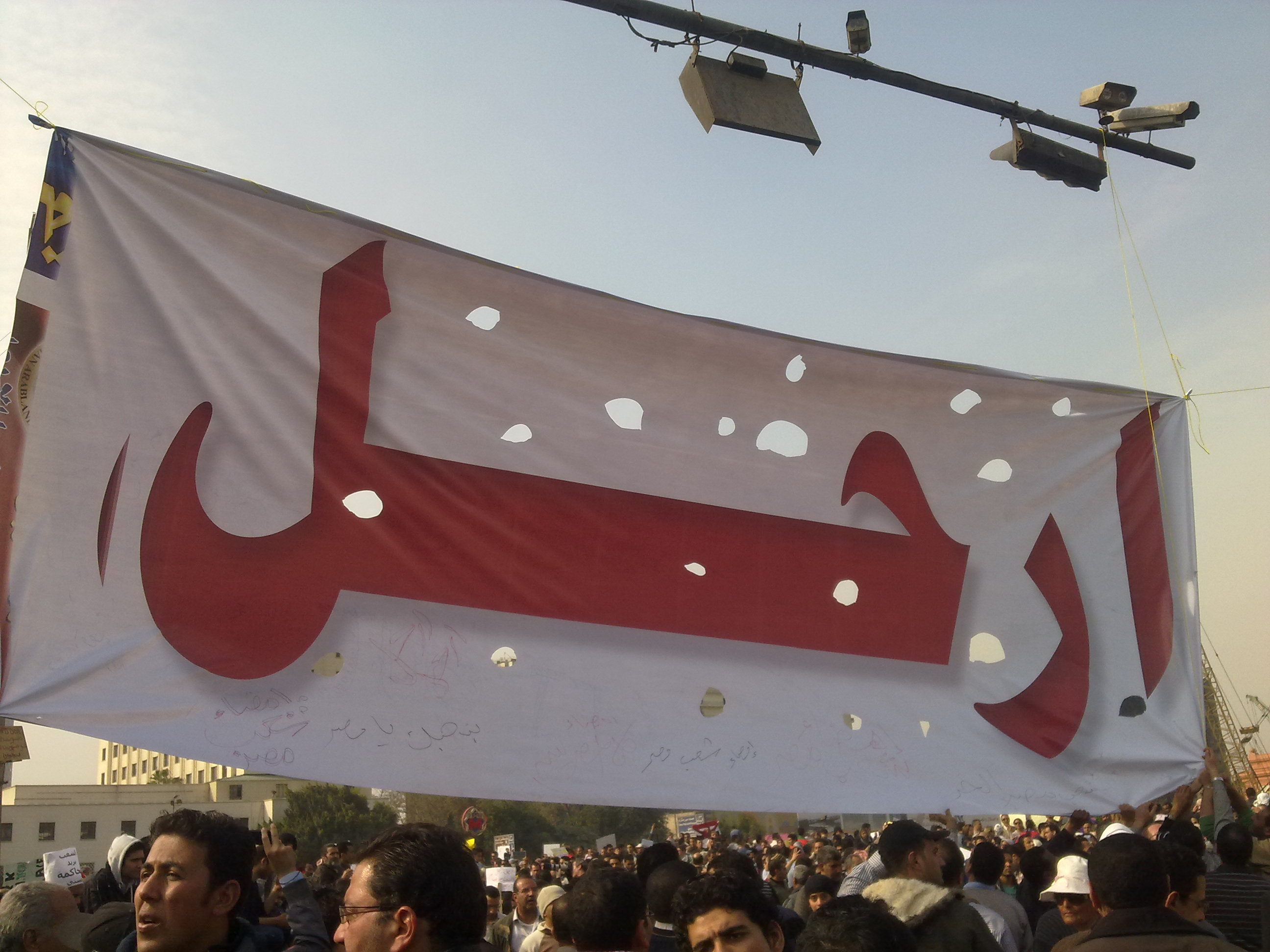
A popular slogan directed at President Mubarak and his government was "irhal" (إرحل), meaning "leave!".

On 2–3 February, 13 people were killed and 1,200 injured, according to the Egyptian health ministry.

In Cairo, a standoff took place in front of the Egyptian Museum in the early morning hours with rocks and petrol bombs reportedly flying. Large-caliber shots were reportedly fired in the air by the army to keep opposing factions at bay. There was a heavy police presence at the museum following the standoff. Anti-government protesters banged on metal railings while rocks were thrown at them.

Protests continued in Alexandria and Mansoura, where Al Jazeera suggested up to a million people marched. In Cairo, Egyptian army tanks cleared a highway overpass from which pro-Mubarak protesters had been hurling rocks and Molotov cocktails onto the anti-Mubarak protesters. On the streets below, hundreds of armed soldiers lined up between the two factions, pushing the pro-Mubarak protesters back and blocking the main hotspots in front of the Egyptian Museum and at other entrances to the square. Violence was reported to have been perpetrated by police.

The Prosecutor General decided to prevent former ministers and government officials Ahmed Abdel Aziz Ahmed Ezz, Mohamed Zuhair Mohamed Waheed Garana, Ahmed Alaa El Din Maghraby, Habib Ibrahim El Adly and others from traveling outside the country. He also froze their bank accounts, and established investigative authorities and procedures to identify and investigate criminal and administrative responsibilities in all of these cases.

With banks not due to reopen for three more days, cash-starved Egyptians reportedly were offered food and money to side against the anti-Mubarak protesters in Tahrir Square. Bloomberg reported that Vodafone had been forced by the Egyptian government to send SMS text messages to its customers. The pro-Mubarak messages characterized protesters as disloyal and called upon recipients to "confront" them. Vodafone CEO Vittorio Colao reported that the general public was still blocked from sending text messages.

Shahira Amin resigned from her position as deputy head of Nile TV, citing its coverage of the protests, saying, "I walked out yesterday. I can't be part of the propaganda machine; I am not going to feed the public lies." Many international journalists in Egypt covering the protests were detained, beaten, shouted at or threatened by pro-Mubarak protesters, as were numerous Egyptian bloggers and activists including Wael Abbas. Two Al Jazeera reporters were attacked as they arrived from the airport while three others were arrested and later released.

I was very unhappy about yesterday. I do not want to see Egyptians fighting each other ... I don't care what people say about me. Right now I care about my country, I care about Egypt ... I would never run away. I will die on this soil.

— Hosni Mubarak

In an interview, Mubarak said that he was "fed up" with being in power but would not resign because he did not want Egypt to descend into a chaos in which the Muslim Brotherhood would be the beneficiaries. Suleiman said, in the same interview, that the Egyptian people do not have a culture of democracy and that an Islamic current is pushing young people to protest. In an interview broadcast on state television, Suleiman reasserted that "The president will not go for another term nor any member of his family including his son. The January 25 youth was not a destructive movement, however it was a demand movement ... Constitution articles 76 and 77 will be modified, other articles are subjected to change." Regarding the clashes in Tahrir Square he commented, "Everyone responsible for these clashes will be questioned ... The clashes had negatively impacted what the president speech had achieved." Regarding economic effects, he commented, "A million tourists had left Egypt in 9 days, imagine the lost revenue." He declared that anyone who had been arrested during the demonstrations would be released unless they had committed a crime. He asked the protesters to go home as all their demands had been heard. He thanked them for their efforts to move political life in Egypt forward.

=== 4 February – Friday of Departure ===
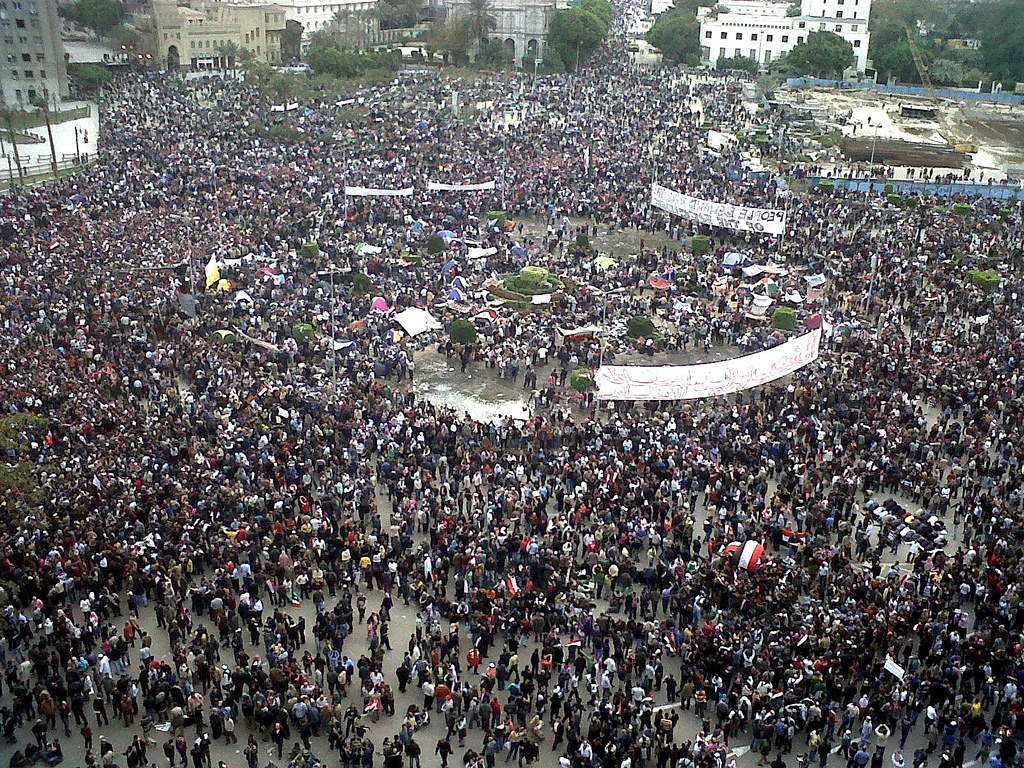
Tahrir Square during the "Friday of Departure"

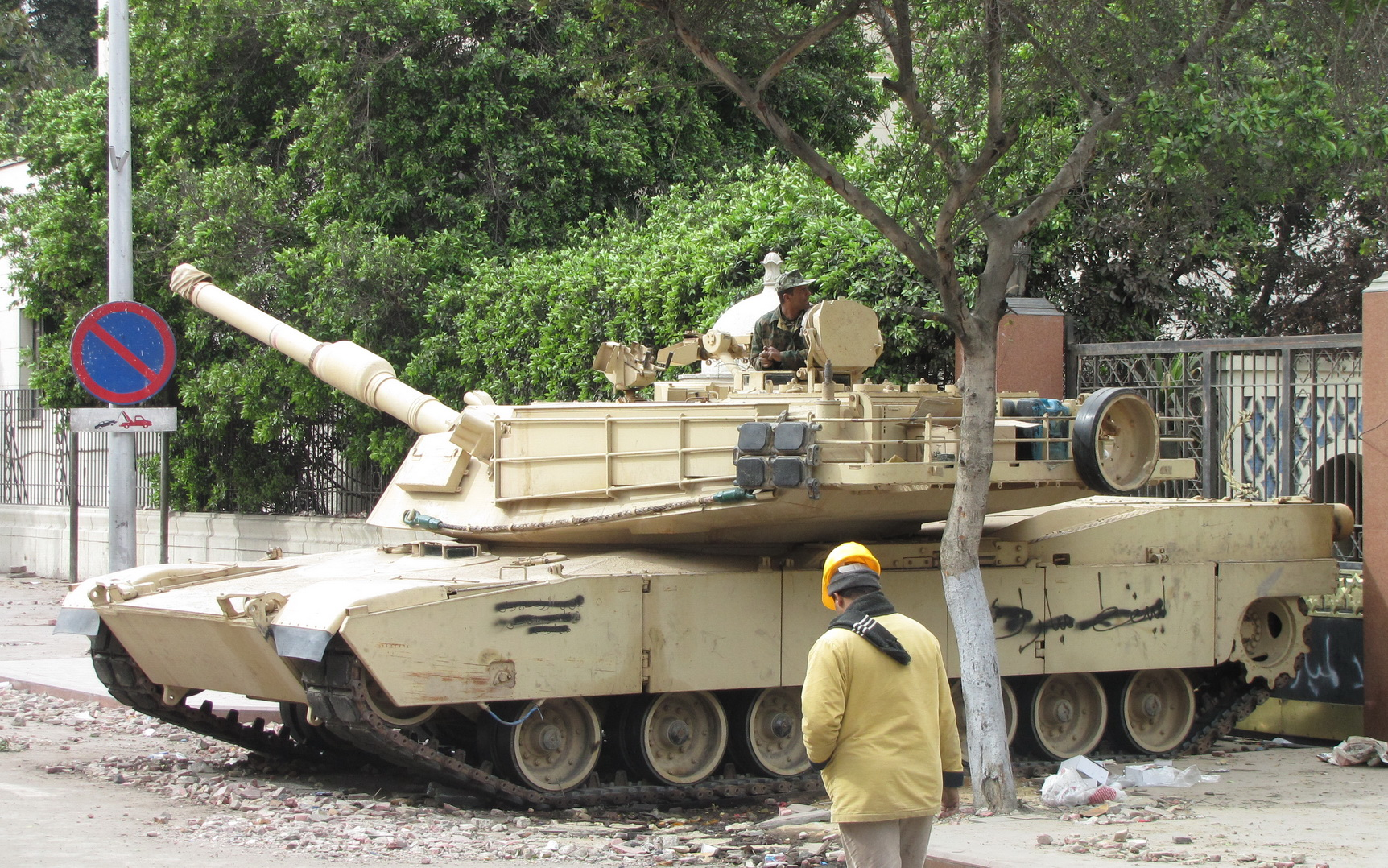
A tank at the entrance to Tahrir Square

During the night of 3–4 February, there were tanks on the street in Cairo as many of the protesters again spent the night in Tahrir Square. Pro-government protesters were active and small-scale clashes happened in the early hours. Ahmad Mohamed Mahmoud of Al-Ta'awun became the first journalist to die covering the protests, from gunshot wounds sustained on 28 January.

The organizers of the "Day of Revolt" and "Friday of Anger" called for a protest which was dubbed the "Friday of Departure". In Cairo, they planned to march to Heliopolis Palace. (Arabic: جمعة الرحيل gumʿat ar-raḥīl) They demanded Mubarak step down immediately, with 4 February as their deadline. Protest marches were also held in Giza and El-Mahalla El-Kubra, Suez, Port Said, Rafah, Ismailiya, Zagazig, al-Mahalla al-Kubra, Aswan and Asyut.

Two million Egyptians flooded Tahrir Square to participate in Friday prayer in Tahrir Square. Egyptian Christians and others not performing Friday prayers formed a "human chain" around those praying to protect them from potential disruptions. The day's planned events began after prayers. Al Jazeera estimated the crowd size to be over one million in Tahrir Square. Protesters held portraits of former presidents Gamal Abdel Nasser and Anwar Sadat. However, protesters did not get to the presidential palace. In Alexandria, over a million protesters turned out, making it the biggest-ever protest there. They warned that if the government used violence against protesters in Cairo, they would march to Cairo to join the protesters.

The New York Times and Bloomberg reported that the US administration was in talks with Egyptian officials over a proposal for Mubarak to resign immediately, turning over power to a transitional government headed by the vice-president, because the longer Mubarak held on to power the more "strident" protesters would become. Saad El-Katatny appeared on Mehwar TV Channel and stated that the Muslim brotherhood and Omar Suleiman reached an agreement in their previous meeting.

The General Prosecutor followed up travel bans and frozen bank accounts on former ministers and government officials including former Minister of Trade and Industry Rachid Mohamed Rachid. He told Al Arabiya that "I returned from Davos to Egypt because of the current situation in Egypt. The new Prime Minister had contacted me for the same position in the new cabinet, I refused because I want fresh blood." Regarding the travel ban, he commented, "I had no idea about the accusations, I served for six and half years and I am completely ready to face any accusation. No one had informed me of this decision and I heard it from the news." He was considered a possible candidate for Prime Minister before the protests.

=== 5 February ===
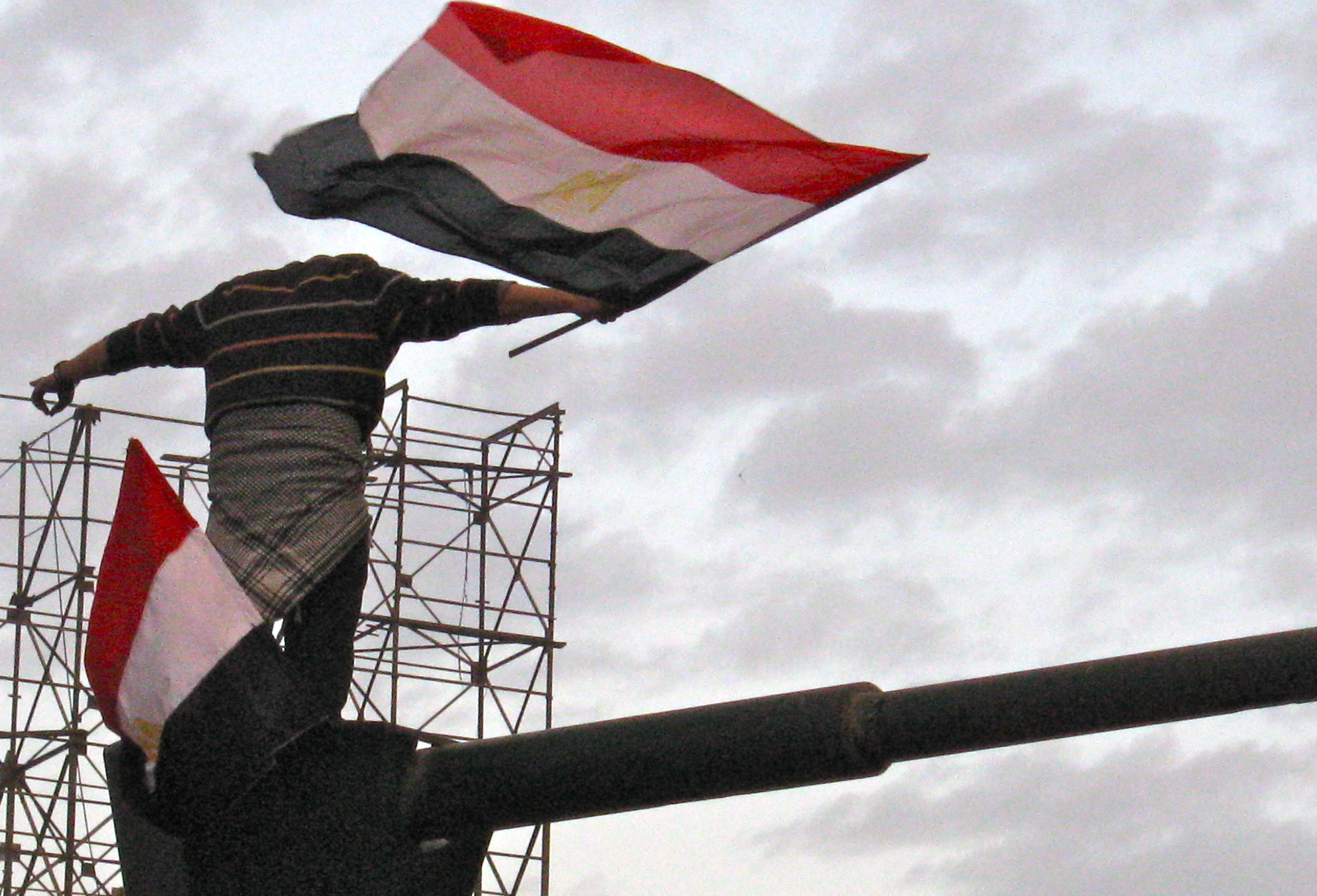
An Egyptian protester holding the Egyptian flag with one hand while showing the V sign with the other

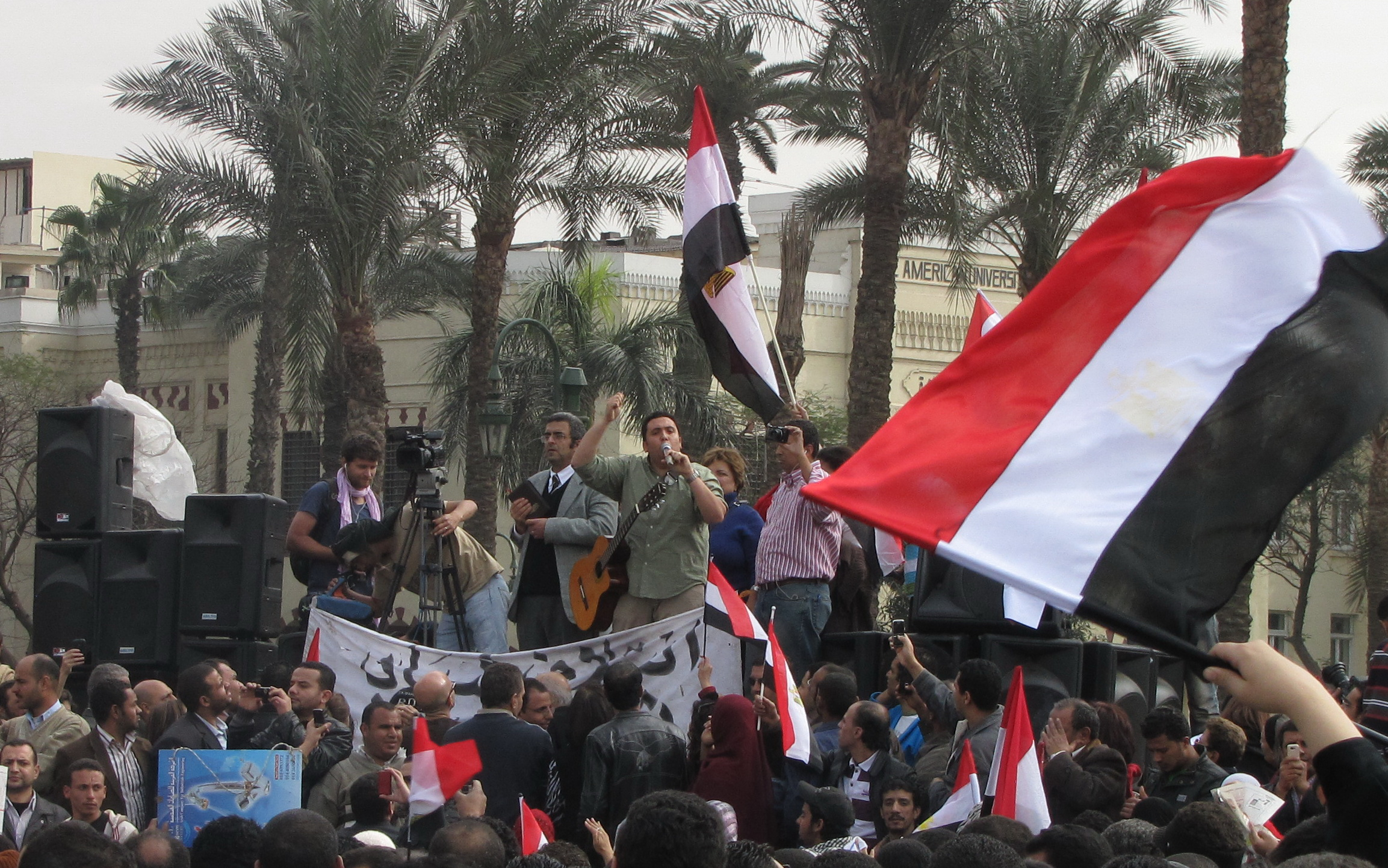
The so-called Etha'et al-thawra (broadcast of the revolution), set upon an elevated stage and used by the demonstrators in Tahrir Square to address the crowds. In the background is the American University in Cairo.

During the night of 4–5 February, a few protesters continued to camp out in Tahrir Square. Early in the morning shots were fired as protesters said pro-Mubarak activists tried to assault the square. Troops then fired into the air to disperse them. Demonstrators later formed a human chain to prevent tanks from passing through the barricades into the square; a witness said scuffles broke out when an army general asked demonstrators to take down their makeshift barricades of corrugated steel and debris. As the army tightened access to Tahrir Square, the head of the army met protesters and asked them to return home. Protesters responded that "he (Mubarak) will go" and they would not. The army was also more organized and present than on any other day of the protest. A heavy military presence continued in central Cairo. An Interior Ministry spokesman said that "the army remains neutral and is not taking sides because if we protect one side we will be perceived as biased....our role is to prevent clashes and chaos as we separate the opposing groups." Scuffles were reported during the day in Tahrir Square and one protester was said to have died. A group of foreigners including an English protester on the 5th and a Swede on the 6th joined the protesters in Tahrir Square, handing out flowers in a sign of solidarity and holding up a banner in English. Five hundred protesters arrived in Tahrir Square from Suez. There were reports of over 10,000 people continuing to stay in Alexandria through the night.

State television announced the appointment of Hossam Badrawi (seen as a member of the liberal wing of the party) as Head of the Shura Council after Safwat El-Sherif's resignation from his position within the party. Mubarak's son Gamal also resigned as Assistant Secretary and Secretary of the Policy Committee. Minister of State for Legal Affairs Mufid Shehab and Presidential Chief-of-Staff Zakaria Azmy were dismissed from the party. Initial reports indicated that Mubarak had resigned as head of the ruling NDP party, however this was later denied by state television and the Information Minister. Former Interior Minister Habib el-Adli and three of his leadership were put under house arrest. There had been reports about the arrest of other security leaders who were being held in a military prison. However, the opposition leaders continued to seek ways to remove Mubarak from power. They called on the protesters to continue at Tahrir Square every Tuesday and Friday until Mubarak "resigns and makes true the demands of the people."

Trouble hit the border city of Rafa as a grenade was tossed into an empty church and the public library was set on fire on 5 February.

=== 6 February – Sunday of Martyrs ===
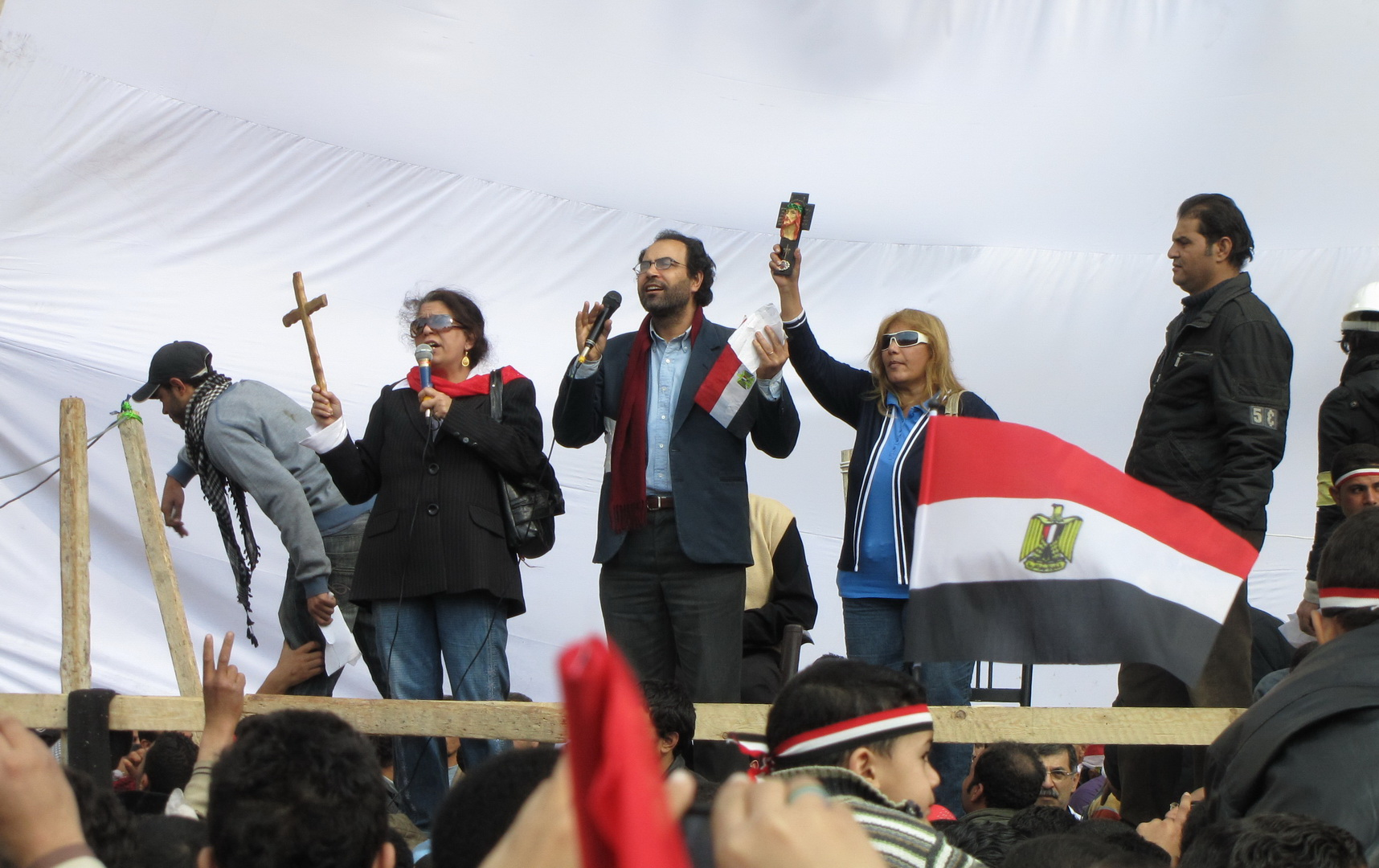
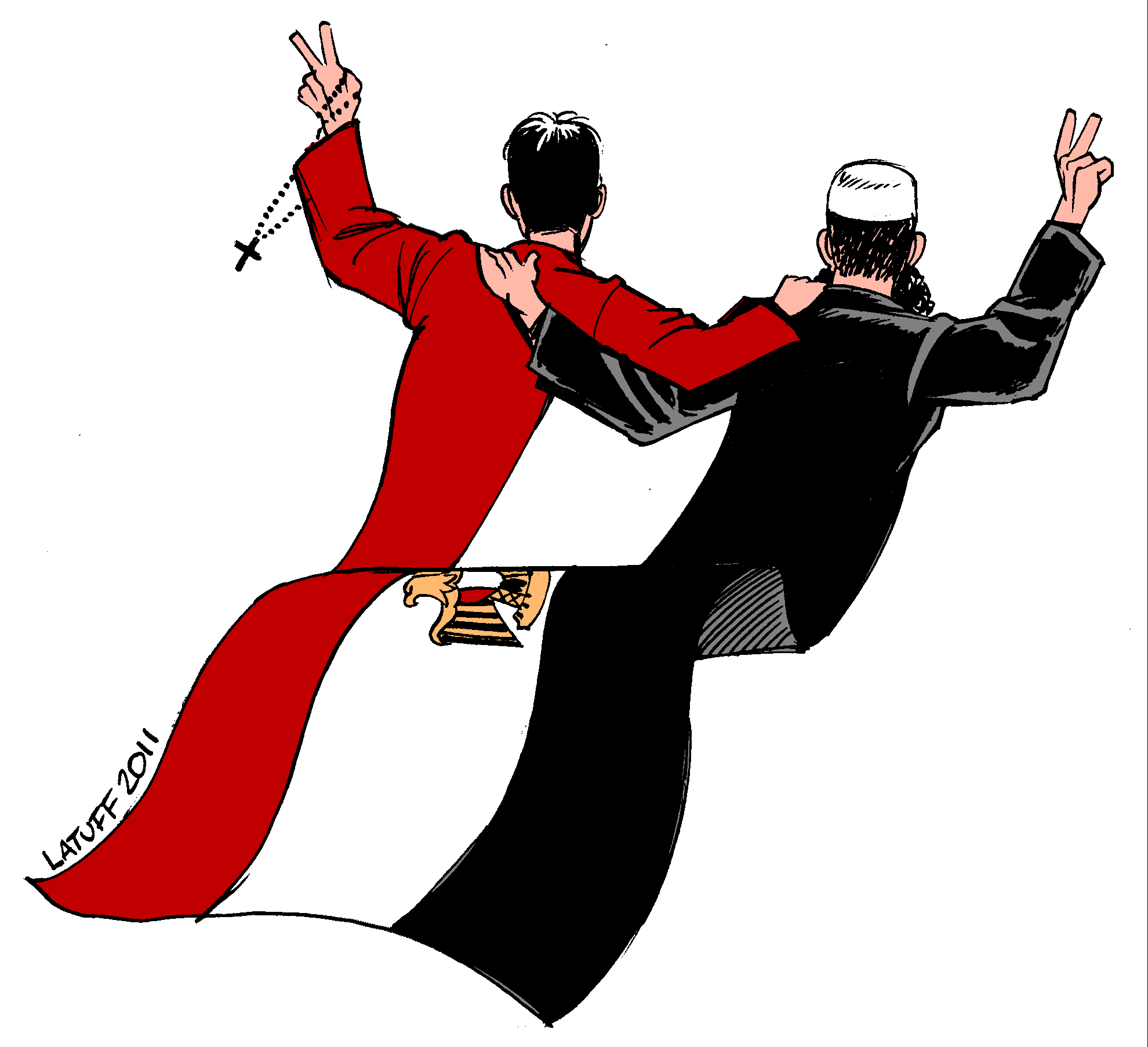
From left to right: Copts leading the crowd in prayer in Tahrir Square and Muslims and Christians United for Egypt, by Carlos Latuff.

During the night of 5–6 February, protesters continued to camp out in Tahrir Square and Alexandria. However, gunfire was heard in the early hours of the day in Cairo. Banks temporarily reopened throughout the country amidst long queues, and people rushed to buy US dollars.

The organizers of the "Day of Revolt", "Friday of Anger", "March of the Millions" and "Friday of Departure" called for a protest that was dubbed the "Sunday of Martyrs" (Arabic: أحد الشهداء).

Copts held their Sunday Mass in Cairo's Tahrir Square as Muslim protesters formed a ring around them to protect them during the service.; They did it to counter claims by state television that most of the anti-Mubarak protesters were members of the Muslim Brotherhood. Copts wanted to show that they were a part of Egypt's popular uprising and shared the grievances. Crowds in Tahrir Square chanted "We are one, we are one" ahead of prayers held at noon for those killed during the protests. Muslims later participated in Salat al-Janazah (Arabic: صلاة الجنازة) (literally: funeral prayer). Protesters in Cairo numbered in the vicinity of one million. Demonstrations continued in Alexandria focused around the train station of El Ramel. Several thousand anti-government protesters continued calling for Mubarak's resignation in Mansoura. Ayman Mohyeldin, an Al Jazeera English journalist, was arrested by soldiers in Tahrir Square, and held for 9 hours.

Vice President Suleiman negotiated with the opposition, including Mohamed Morsi and El-Sayyid el-Badawi. The Muslim Brotherhood said it was talking with the government. Suleiman agreed to set up a committee of judiciary and political figures to study constitutional reforms. The committee was due to meet by early March. Naguib Sawiris, who was involved in the talks, said that "big progress" had been made.

=== 7 February ===
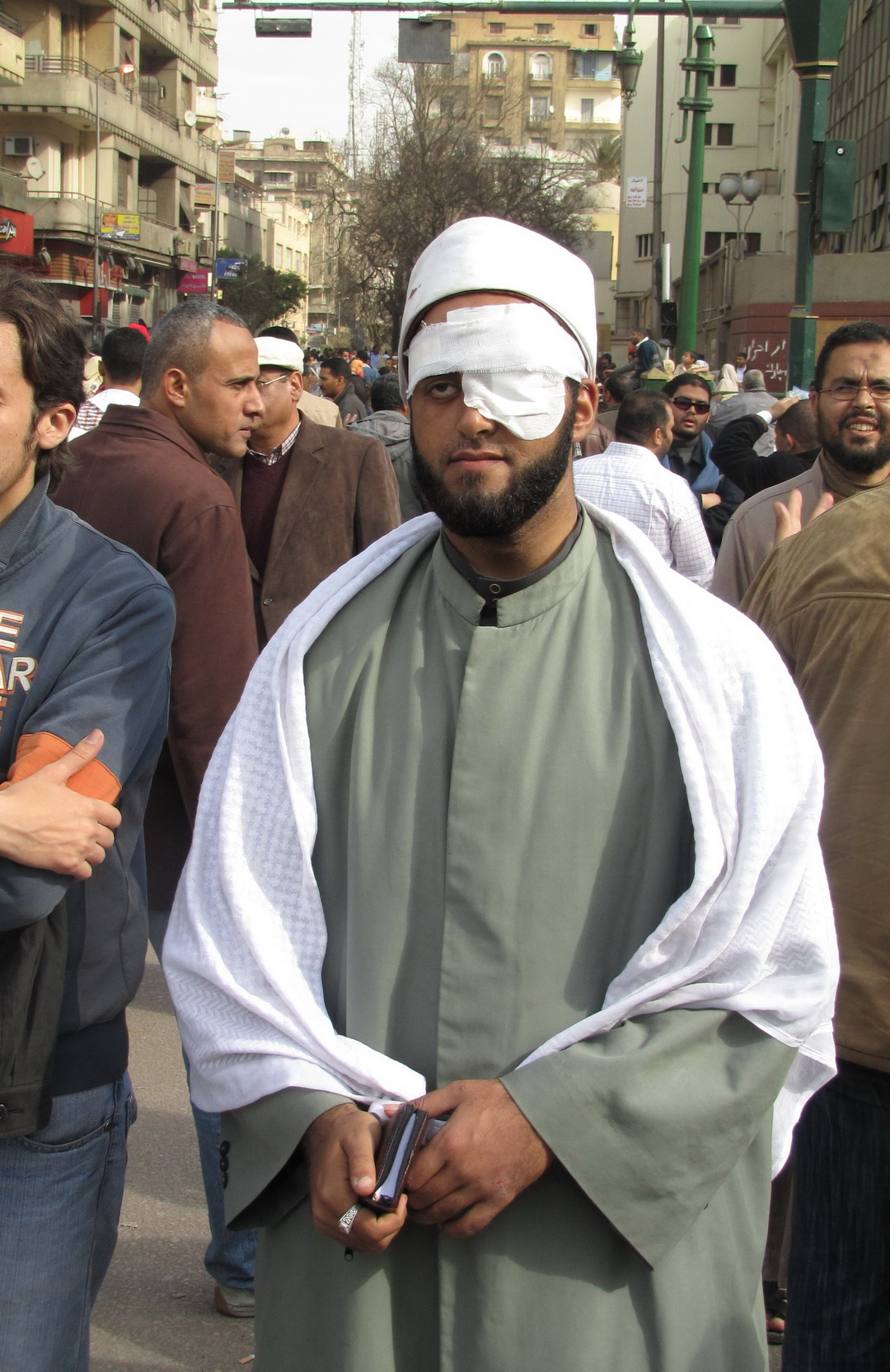
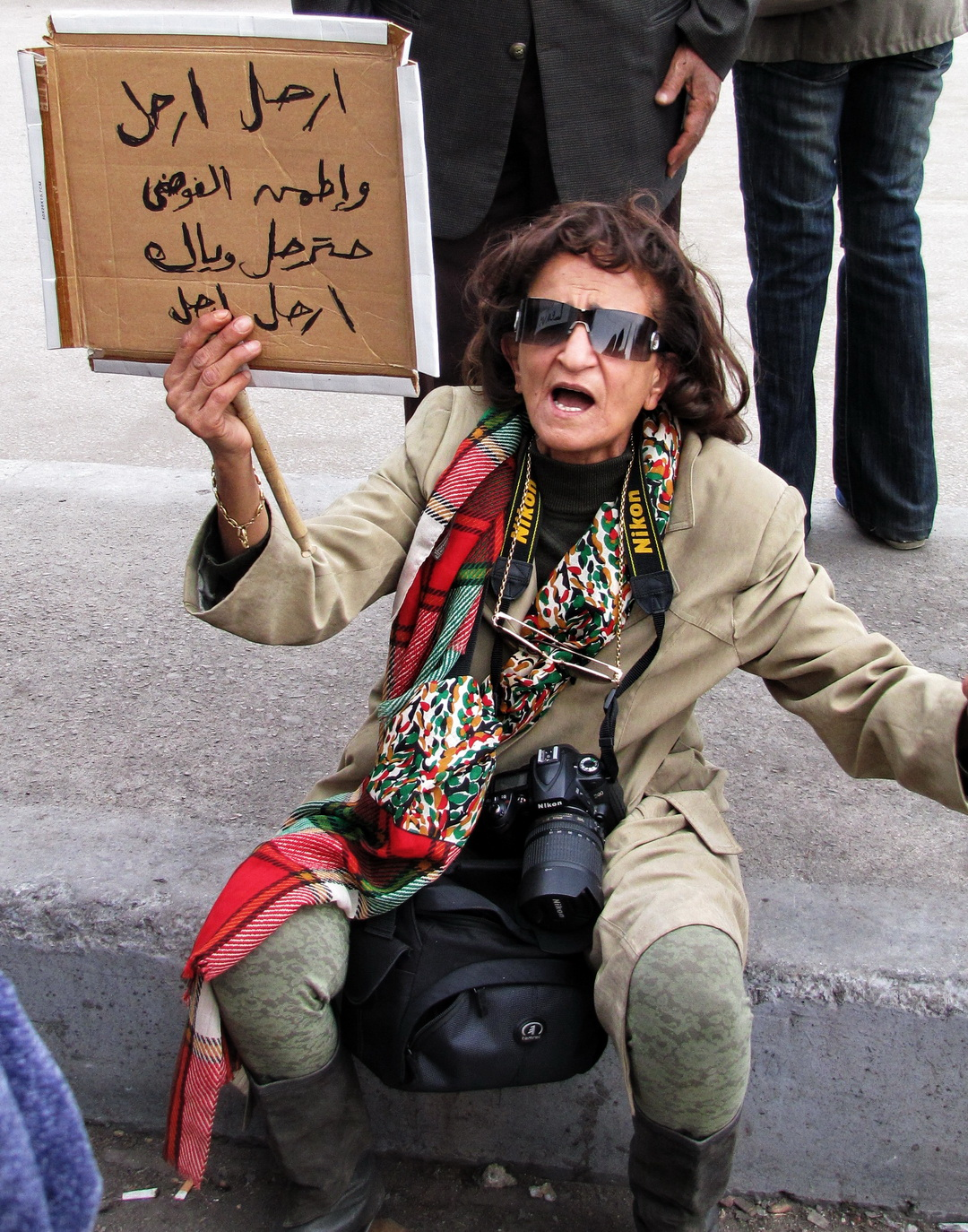
From left to right: An imam of Al-Azhar University, who was wounded in his eye during the protests and An anti-government protester in Tahrir Square. The placard reads "Leave leave and rest assured, the chaos will leave with you, leave leave.".

Hundreds of thousands of protesters camped out in Tahrir Square where a symbolic funeral procession was held for Ahmad Mohamed Mahmoud of Al-Ta'awun. Protesters demanded that an investigation be carried out into the cause of his death. State-owned Al-Ahram, declared its support for the protesters and stopped supporting the government.

At least 70 people were wounded when hundreds of residents attacked the police station in Khargah to demand the ouster of a police official who had a reputation for heavy-handedness. Police then opened fire on the protesters. Authorities said that 11 people had been killed. The United Nations estimated deaths at more than 300.

Former minister of the interior Habib El-Adli faced prosecution in a military court for ordering police to fire at protesters and for his role on 31 December 2010 bombing of al-Qiddissin Church in Alexandria. Minister of Antiquities Zahi Hawass announced that artifacts damaged by looters would be restored over the next five days. He said that steps were being taken to reopen Egypt's famed archaeological sites, which had been closed since pro-democracy protests started. Among the damaged objects was a statue of King Tutankhamun standing on a panther and a wooden sarcophagus from the New Kingdom period, dating to roughly 3,500 years ago. The museum, which is adjacent to the anti-government protests in downtown Cairo, was being guarded by the army. Finance Minister Samir Radwan announced a 15 per cent raise in pensions and salaries for government employees at a cost of E£6.5 billion (US$960 million). This decision was made at the first Cabinet meeting since the protests began. One protester said that protests would not end soon despite the government's increasing concessions. While banks had reopened, schools and the stock exchange remained closed. The Egyptian Stock Exchange said it would resume operation on 13 February.

Wael Ghonim, Google's head of Marketing for the Middle East and North Africa and the founder of the Facebook page that was said to have been influential in fomenting the protests, who had been in custody since 25 January, was reported to have been released. At 20:00, he posted on Twitter that "Freedom is a blessing that deserves fighting for it." (sic) His release from custody and an emotional interview with Mona El-Shazly on DreamTV "inject[ed] new vigor into [the] protest movement". Thousands of supporters joined a Facebook page created in his honour, "We authorise Wael Ghoneim to speak on behalf of the Egyptian revolution." He issued a statement reading:

First of all my sincere condolences for all the Egyptians that lost their lives. I am really sorry for their loss, none of us wanted this. We were not destroying things.

We all wanted peaceful protests, and our slogan was no to vandalism.

Please don't turn me into a hero. I am not a hero, I am someone that was asleep for 12 days. The real heroes are the ones that took to the streets, please focus your cameras on the right people.

I am ok. (sic) God willing we will change our country, and all the filth that was taking place in the country has to stop. Together we will clean this country.

— Wael Ghonim

=== 8 February – Day of Egypt's Love ===
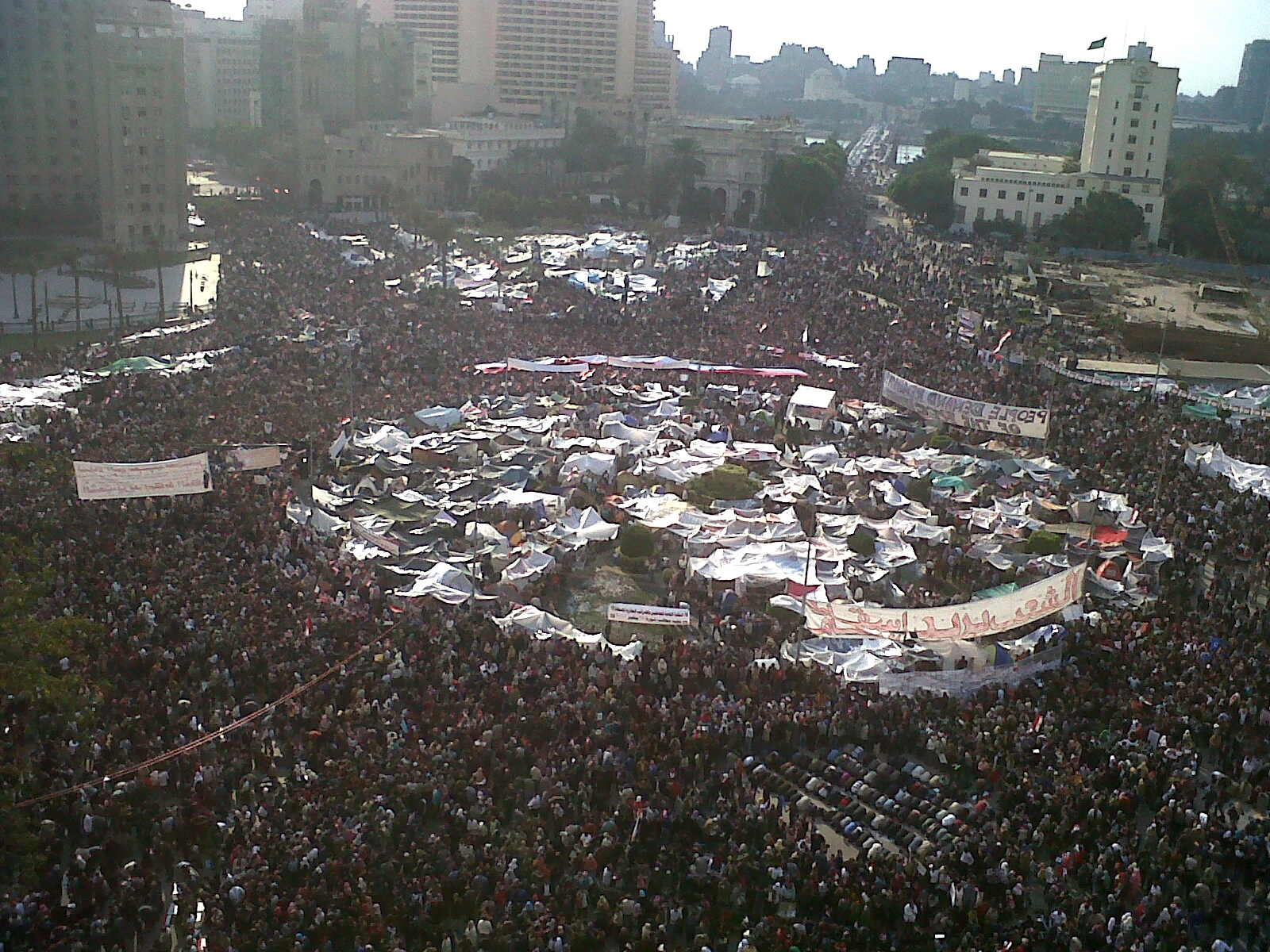
Tahrir Square during the "Day of Egypt's Love"

The earlier organizers called for a new protest in what was dubbed the "Day of Egypt's Love". (Arabic: يوم حب مصر).

Over a million people gathered in and around Tahrir Square to demonstrate. At least 1,000 went to the parliament to demand Mubarak's resignation while others went to the Shura Council and the Council of Ministers. They later slept in front of those buildings, besides the usual camp in Tahrir Square. Hundreds of journalists gathered in the lobby of the state-owned newspaper Al-Ahram's headquarters to protest corruption and to call for greater freedom of the press. A substantial protest took place in Alexandria, while workers at the Suez Canal went on strike. BBC correspondents reported that by the afternoon the protests had the highest turnout to date.

Ibrahim Yosri, a lawyer and former deputy foreign minister, drafted a petition, along with 20 other lawyers, asking the Prosecutor General Abdel Meguid Mahmoud to try Mubarak and his family for stealing state wealth. According to the state-owned Middle East News Agency, The newly appointed Mubarak's Interior Minister, Mahmoud Wagdy, issued an order releasing 34 political detainees, mostly members of the Muslim Brotherhood.

In a statement on Egyptian state television, Suleiman announced the formation of two independent committees for political and constitutional reforms, both starting work immediately. One committee would carry out constitutional and legislative amendments to enable a shift of power. The other would monitor the implementation of all proposed reforms. Suleiman also stressed that demonstrators would not be prosecuted and that a separate independent fact-finding committee would be established to probe the violence of 2 February. He said that wider press freedoms were under consideration and that he would produce a list of what was needed to hold free elections. He also said that plans were underway to organize a peaceful transfer of power. Suleiman reiterated his view that Egypt was not ready for democracy, while warning of a possible coup d'état unless demonstrators agreed to enter negotiations.

=== 9 February ===
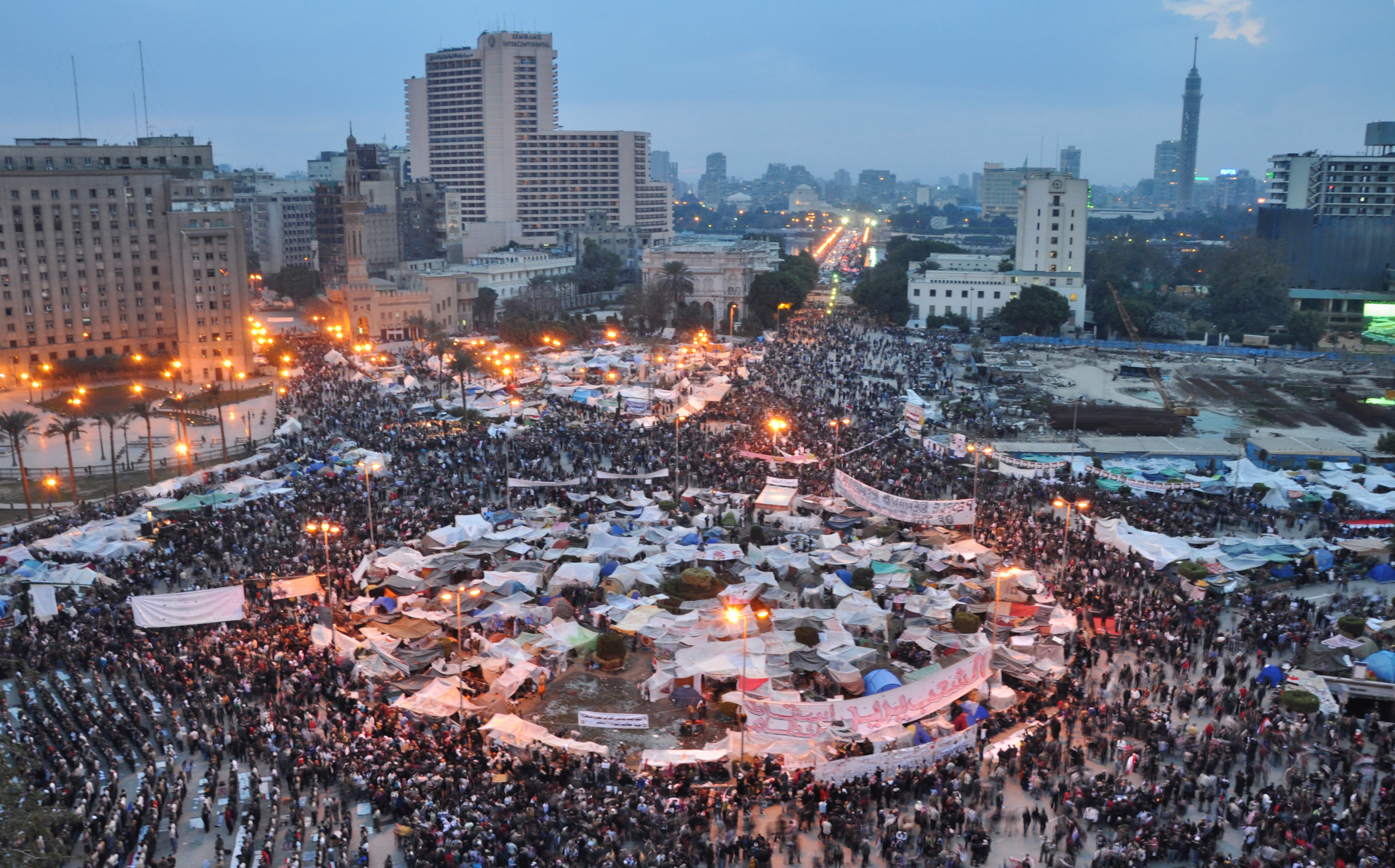
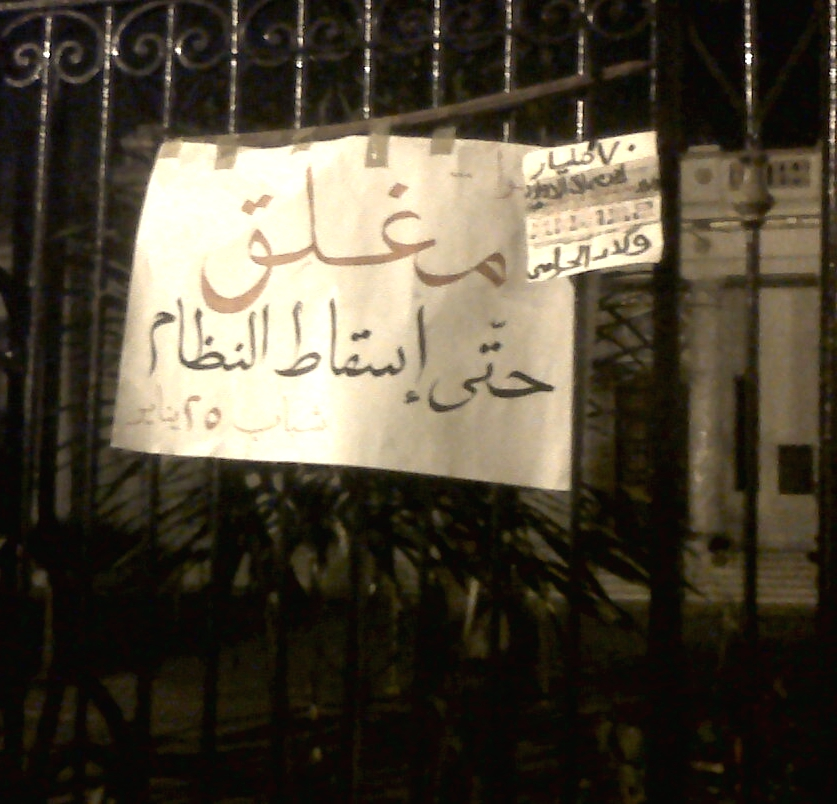
From left to right: Tahrir Square during the evening of 9 February and a sign on the Parliament building in Cairo on 9 February, reading "Closed until the fall of the regime".

Some protesters moved from Tahrir Square to the area outside the parliament buildings, while demanding the assembly's immediate dissolution. The demonstrators put up a sign that said: "Closed until the fall of the regime". Cabinet offices in Cairo were evacuated after anti-government protesters gathered outside the building. Meanwhile, labour unions across the country, and particularly in Alexandria, Cairo and Suez, staged general strikes, demanding higher wages and better treatment. The strikers were said to number around 20,000 workers. Violent clashes were reported in Wadi al-Jadid, where police stations and the NDP party building were destroyed, and several deaths and hundreds of injuries also occurred. Protesters in Port Said burnt down the governor's office in response to his reluctance to provide enough housing for the city's residents. Clashes were said to have killed three people and wounded hundreds more in the past two days.

Egyptians living outside the country returned to join the anti-government demonstrations. An Internet campaign sought to mobilise thousands of expatriates to return home and support the uprising.

The government followed up on a prisoner amnesty from the previous day, releasing 1,000 more prisoners who had served three-quarters of their sentence; 840 more were released from Sinai province. The Muslim Brotherhood continued to demand for Mubarak's resignation. The offices of state-owned Channel 5 in Alexandria were shut down and evacuated under the order of its chief amid mounting pressure by protesters. The government warned of a military crackdown amid ongoing protests. Foreign Minister Ahmed Aboul Gheit rejected US calls to repeal the emergency law and also accused the US of trying to impose its will on the Egyptian government. The newly appointed Mubarak's Culture Minister Gaber Asfour resigned after one week in office, citing health problems.

=== 10 February ===
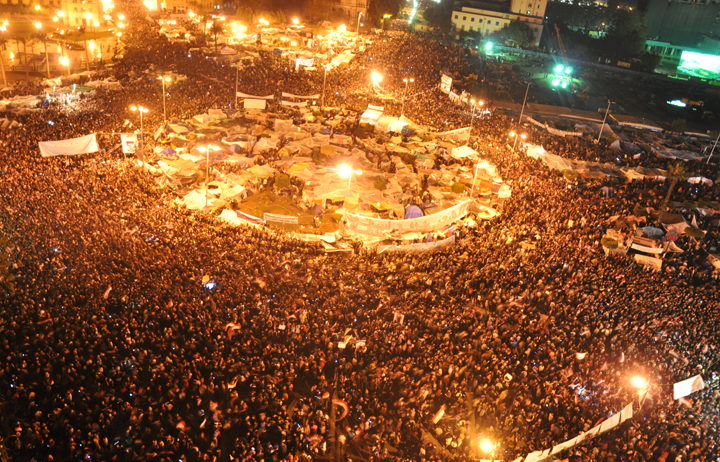
Hundreds of thousands protesting in Tahrir Square on 10 February 2011 after Hosni Mubarak's speech saying that they'll go to his palace the day after.

The protests continued at Tahrir Square and the parliament building. 3,000 lawyers marched from the lawyers' syndicate in downtown Cairo to Abdeen Palace, one of Mubarak's official residences. About a thousand physicians, dressed in white coats, also arrived at Tahrir Square to applause. Strikes at national industries, including tourism and transportation, continued and spread to Alexandria, Mahalla and Port Said. Protesters around Egypt, expecting Mubarak's resignation, were described as euphoric, while singing and waving Egyptian flags. Fighter aircraft were heard above the Tahrir Square at 20:00 amid calls for the "destruction of the regime." In Alexandria, over 1,000 "diehard" protesters were reported by the train station.

Prior to Mubarak's speech, contradictory reports from various media sources around the world stated that either Suleiman or Tantawi was expected to take over. The military council also met without Mubarak. The Muslim Brotherhood had feared a coup at one point. The head of the NDP said that Mubarak should go for the good of the country.

Al Hurra TV reported that Mubarak was planning to hand authority to the Egyptian army. General Hassan al-Roueini, the military commander for the Cairo area, told protesters in Tahrir Square, "All your demands will be met today." State TV added that Mubarak would speak that night from his Cairo palace. This came after Egypt's military proclaimed on television that they had stepped in to "safeguard the country". The Associated Press suggested a military coup might be occurring. State TV showed Defence Minister Field Marshal Mohamed Hussein Tantawi meeting with two dozen top army officers. Mubarak and Suleiman were not present.

... I thought I would delegate powers to the vice president, according to the constitution ...

— Hosni Mubarak

However, information minister Anas el-Fiqqi, denied that Mubarak would resign. Prime Minister Ahmed Shafiq said, "everything is in the hands of President Hosni Mubarak and no decisions have been taken yet." Al Arabiya television, citing "trusted sources" just minutes before Mubarak was to speak, said he would transfer his powers to his vice president.

In his television statement, Mubarak said that he would penalise those responsible for the violence and had a clear vision on how to end the crisis, but was satisfied with what he had offered. He stated that while remaining president to the end of his term in September he would transfer his powers to the vice-president. As far as transfer of power was concerned, Mubarak said "I have seen that it is required to delegate the powers and authorities of the president to the vice president as dictated in the constitution,". The constitutional article was used to transfer powers if the president was "temporarily" unable to carry out his duties and did not require his resignation. He also said he would request six constitutional amendments and that he would lift emergency laws when security in the country permitted. Mubarak said he would stay in the country and was "adamant to continue to shoulder my responsibility to protect the constitution and safeguard the interests of the people ... until power is handed over to those elected in September by the people in free and fair elections in which all the guarantees of transparencies will be secured."

Protesters watched in stunned silence or in anger to his speech, some crying or waving their shoes in the air. People in Tahrir Square chanted "Leave! Leave! Leave!" after Mubarak's speech. Suleiman called on the protesters to go home. Protesters then moved to the state television and radio buildings. Soon after the television announcement, a large number of protesters began to march towards the presidential palace. ElBaradei said, "Egypt will explode" because Mubarak refused to step down and called on the military to intervene.

Mubarak's top aides, family and son Gamal told him he could ride out the turmoil, which convinced him to cling to power. It was also reported that one son, Alaa, accused his younger brother Gamal of ruining their father's reputation. Eyewitnesses said that the Egyptian army had pulled out troops from many locations near the presidential palace.

=== 11 February ===
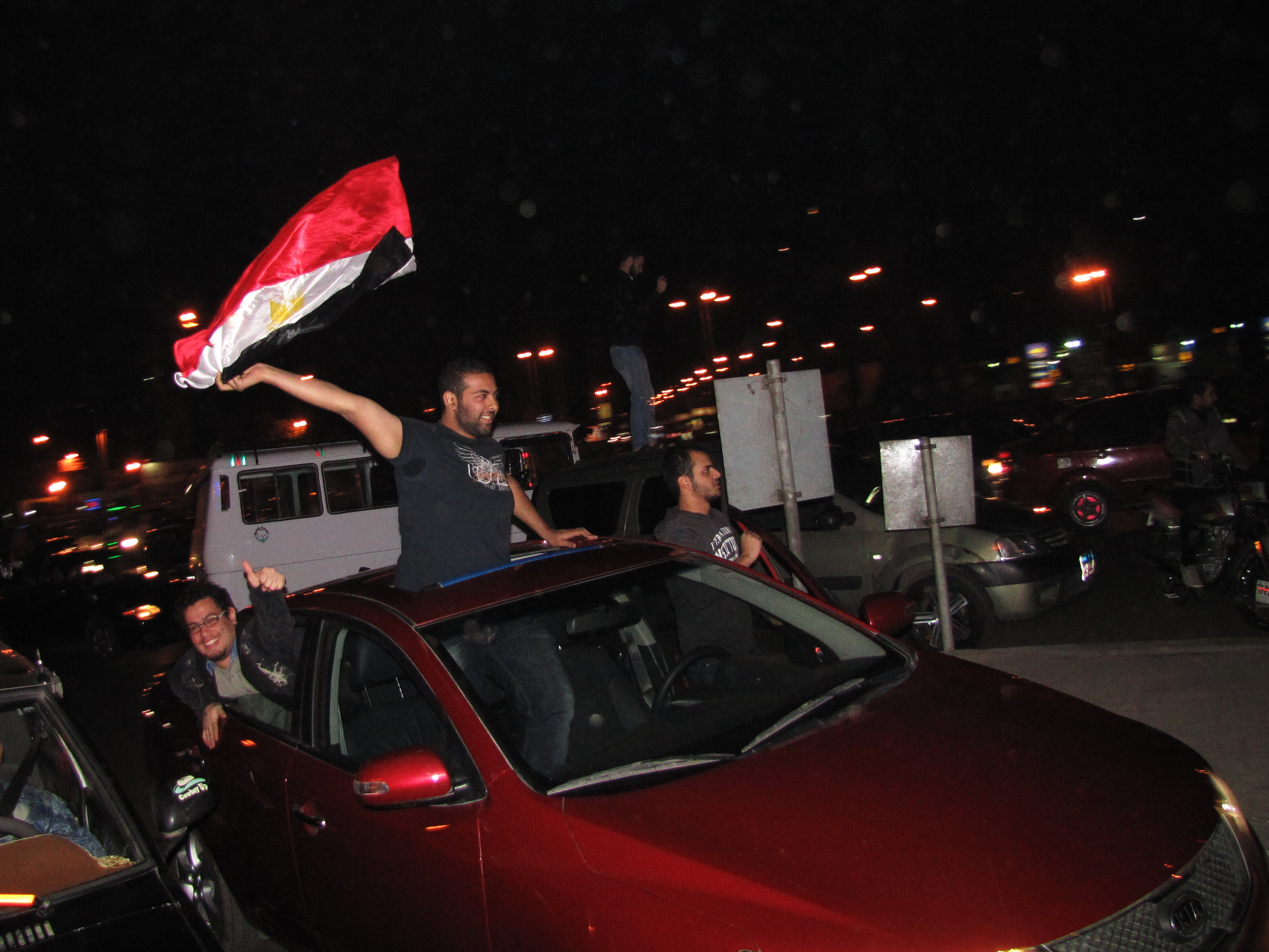
Egyptians in Giza celebrate Mubarak's resignation.

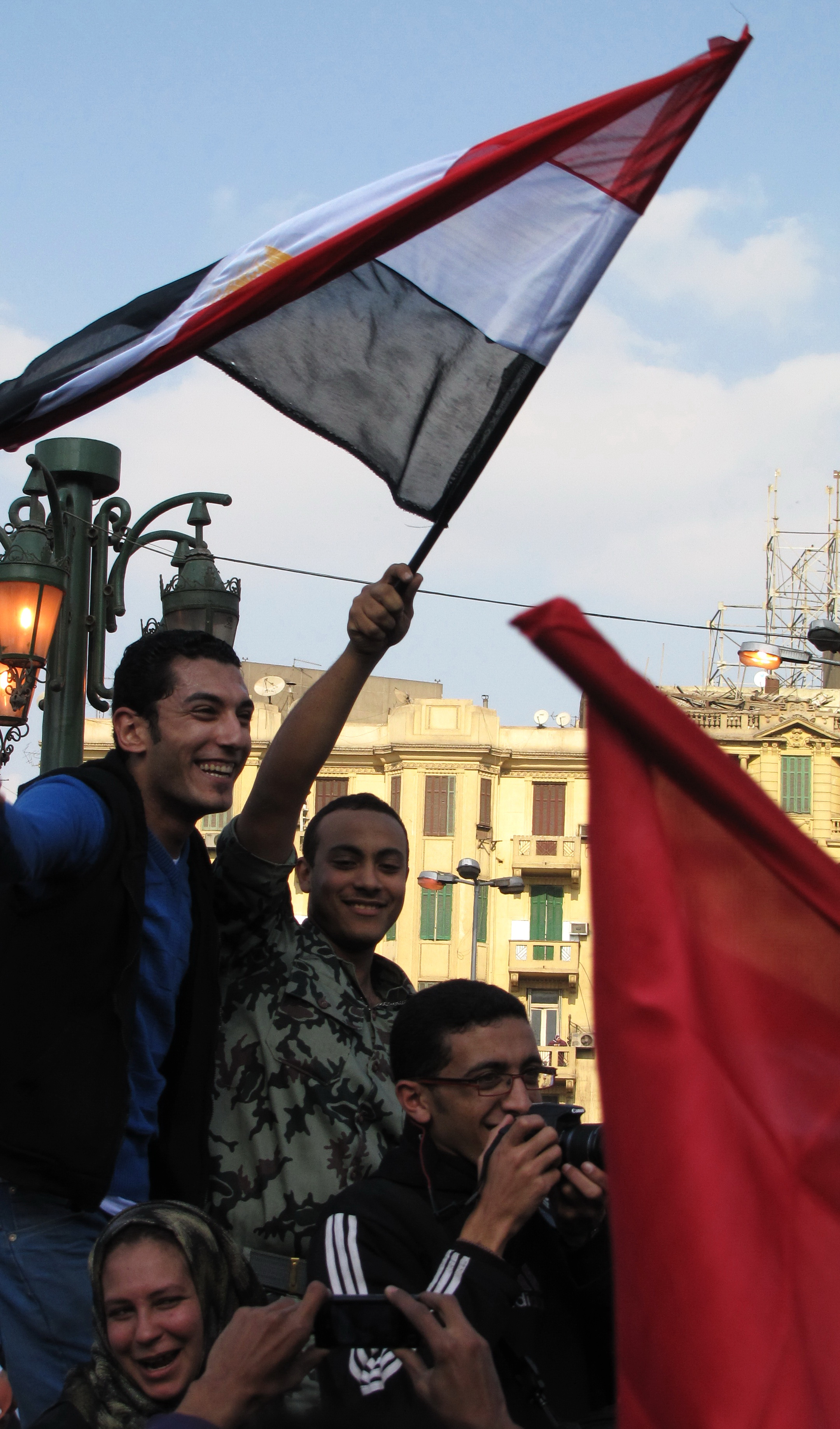
A soldier joins the protesters in celebration of Mubarak's downfall.

Shock that Mubarak did not step down resulted in a nationwide escalation of protests on 11 February, named again as the "Friday of Departure" by the opposition movement. Massive protests continued in Cairo, Alexandria, and other cities. The presidential palace and parliament remained surrounded by protesters and thousands of people surrounded the state TV building, keeping anyone from entering or leaving. The army issued a communiqué supporting Mubarak's attempt to remain de jure president. Hossam Badrawi, the new secretary of the NDP, resigned from unhappiness with Mubarak's refusal to leave.

Demonstrators began to gather at new locations in Cairo. The army surrounded the presidential palace and state television and radio buildings as protesters surrounded the Egyptian radio and television union building demanding fair media coverage. State television shifted its attitude towards the protesters and begun referring to them as Jan25 Youth, admitting mistakes had been made in the media coverage of the protests: "We [the state TV] were under an information chaos," the news anchor stated. "We had strict orders from external sides." Major protests occurred in Alexandria and Mansoura. In Arish, in north Sinai, the second police station in 24 hours came under heavy arms fire—including RPGs—in which at least one protester was killed and 20 injured, with possibly more police fatalities.

==== Resignation of Mubarak ====
The people of Egypt have spoken, their voices have been heard, and Egypt will never be the same.

— Barack Obama, United States president

As the protesters started marching onto the presidential palace in the morning, Mubarak and his family reportedly left the palace by helicopter which took them to the nearby Almaza Airbase, where they boarded the presidential jet and headed to Sharm el-Sheikh. Former Finance Minister Youssef Boutros Ghali fled to Beirut, Lebanon.

Vice President Omar Suleiman announced Mubarak's resignation shortly after 18:00 (EGY) on 11 February:

In the name of God the merciful, the compassionate. Citizens, during these very difficult circumstances Egypt is going through, President Hosni Mubarak has decided to step down from the office of president of the republic and has charged the high council of the armed forces to administer the affairs of the country. May God help everybody.

Mubarak's resignation was followed by nationwide celebrations. ElBaradei told the Associated Press "This is the greatest day of my life. The country has been liberated after decades of repression," and he expected a "beautiful" transition of power. Various media outlets pointed out that this date was also the anniversary of the Iranian Revolution, which occurred on 11 February 1979.

An exchange-traded fund based on the Egyptian stock market listed at the NYSE Euronext increased by 5% following the announcement. Egyptian five-year credit default swaps fell by 0.25%. Al Arabiya reported that the military council said it would sack the cabinet and dissolve parliament, although they only did the latter. Celebrations and car honking were reported in Alexandria and Cairo, along with celebratory gunfire in the Gaza Strip.

CBS correspondent Lara Logan was covering the post-resignation celebrations in Tahrir Square when she was sexually assaulted and beaten before being saved by a group of women and an estimated 20 Egyptian soldiers.
