= June 2013 Egyptian protests =

Demonstrations against President Mohamed Morsi

30 June protests
- Part of the 2012–2013 Egyptian protests during the Egyptian Crisis
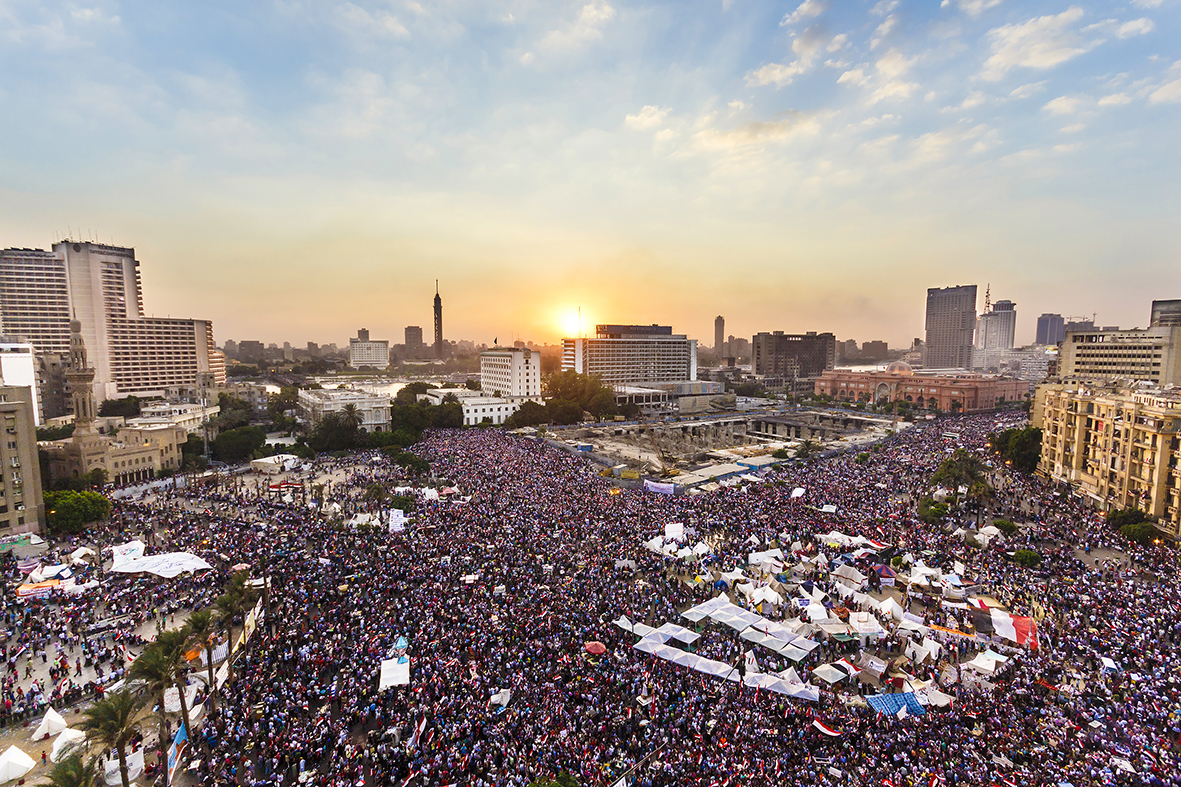
- Tahrir Square, 2 July 2013
- Date: 30 June 2013 – 3 July 2013 (3 days)
- Location: Egypt; 30°2′40″N 31°14′8″E
- Caused by: Policies of President Mohamed Morsi
- Goals: Overthrow of Mohamed Morsi; Suspension of the constitution; Early presidential elections
- Result: 2013 Egyptian coup d'état

Parties
Opposition: Political groups/movements: National Salvation Front; Tamarod; April 6 Youth Movement; Revolutionary Socialists; Free Egyptians Party; Al-Wafd; Institutions: Al-Azhar; Coptic Orthodox Church; Judges' Club; Unaffiliated protesters: Nationalists; Liberals; Leftists; Secularists; Anarchists; Feminists; Artists and intellectuals; Anti-sexual harassment activists; Others	Government: Muslim Brotherhood; FJP (Constituent Assembly); Qandil Cabinet; Egyptian Islamic Labour Party

Lead figures
Mahmoud Badr (co-leader of Tamarod); Mohamed ElBaradei (co-leader of the NSF and leader of the Constitution Party); Hamdeen Sabahi (co-leader of the NSF and leader of the Egyptian Popular Current); Amr Moussa (co-leader of the NSF and leader of Conference Party); George Isaac (key opposition activist and member of the Constitution Party); Ahmed Maher (co-leader of the April 6 Youth Movement); Mohamed Abou El-Ghar (leader of the Egyptian Social Democratic Party)	Mohamed Morsi (President of Egypt); Hesham Qandil (Prime Minister of Egypt); Saad El-Katatni (Chairman of the Freedom and Justice Party); Mohammed Badie (Supreme Guide of the Muslim Brotherhood); Khairat el-Shater (Deputy Supreme Guide of the Muslim Brotherhood)

Protests occurred in Egypt on 30 June 2013, marking the one-year anniversary of Mohamed Morsi's presidency. The events ended with the 2013 Egyptian coup d'état after mass protests demanding the immediate resignation of the president. The rallies were partly a response to Tamarod, an ostensibly grassroots movement that launched a petition in April 2013, calling for Morsi and his government to step down. Tamarod claimed to have collected more than 22 million signatures by 30 June, although this figure was not verified by independent sources. A counter-campaign in support of Morsi's presidency, named Tagarod ("Impartiality"), claimed to have collected 26 million signatures by the same date, but this figure was also unverified.

The movements in opposition to Morsi culminated in the 30 June protests that occurred across the country. According to the Egyptian military, which calculated the number of protesters via helicopter scans of demonstration perimeters across the country, the 30 June protests had 32 million protesters, making them "the biggest protests in Egypt's history." However, independent observers raised concerns that the Egyptian government exaggerated the actual number of anti-Morsi protestors, with some research determining that only around one to two million people protested across the country against Morsi.

Reasons for demanding Morsi's resignation included accusations of increasing authoritarianism and his pushing through an Islamist agenda disregarding the predominantly secular opposition or the rule of law. The uprising concluded seven months of protests that started when the Morsi government issued a highly controversial constitutional declaration that gave him temporary sweeping powers over the state's judicial system until the new constitution was passed. The 30 June protests resulted in the overthrow of Morsi by the Egyptian military three days later, with Adly Mansour replacing Morsi as president of Egypt on 4 July.

== Terminology ==
The event is described as the Counter-Revolution by many analysts and scholars, the 30 June Revolution (Arabic: ثورة ٣٠ يونيو) or simply 30/6 Revolution by Egyptian who supported the coup, state media and some Middle Eastern media. They were also referred to as the Second Egyptian Revolution by several international media outlets. (Note: See) The Tamarod movement's highly successful goal to mobilize the protests is also strongly associated with the naming of the uprising and some organizations like the Washington Institute for Near East Policy dubbed it the Tamarod Revolution.

== Background ==
Amid growing anger against the regime, President Hosni Mubarak, whose reign was marked by increasing corruption and authoritarianism, resigned on 11 February 2011 following 18 days of mass protests that marked the beginning of a new era of political instability in Egypt. The subsequent transitional period, which saw the Supreme Council of the Armed Forces (SCAF) taking power under Field Marshal Muhammad Tantawi immediately after Mubarak's ouster, saw renewed deadly clashes and human rights abuses. A round of elections started to take place in the country starting with the 2011 referendum, in which a majority approved of reforms drafted by a military-formed committee. The election however proved to be highly controversial despite some reforms viewed as positive (such as limiting the president's time in office to two four-year terms). Many opposition figures and activists were upset with the reforms as they were drafted in just ten days and were offered to the public for only three weeks before the referendum. Two of the country's largest political forces back then, the Muslim Brotherhood and remnants of the former National Democratic Party, have endorsed the reforms. This turnout proved highly beneficial for the Brotherhood in the following months as they achieved nearly all of their political ambitions including a majority win for the Islamist current in the 2011–12 parliamentary election, during which the Brotherhood was accused by many opposition figures of making deals with the military while protesters were being killed by security forces. Their efforts culminated with Mohamed Morsi winning against Ahmed Shafik by 51.7% in the 2012 presidential election.

=== Constituent Assembly of 2012 ===
In April, a couple of months prior to Morsi's inauguration, the Administrative Court suspended a constituent assembly previously appointed in March without giving any clear reasons for this decision and which the Brotherhood claimed was politically motivated. In mid-June however, another 100-member assembly was officially selected a week after a deal was reached between the ruling military council and representatives of 22 parties. Tensions later resumed after a court ruled that the entire Islamist-dominated parliament was illegally elected and ordered the body to dissolve, which angered the Brotherhood and Mohamed Beltagy called it a "full-fledged coup". On 18 June, the SCAF issued a supplementary constitutional declaration that limits the to-be president's power over the military and gives it complete control over all army decisions. However, those controversial moves never changed the status of the constituent assembly as it was elected by the Shura Council not by parliament. Also, the same day the military delivered its statement, Hossam El-Gheriany was elected as chairman of the assembly. Military chief Mohamed Hussein Tantawi was forced to retire by Morsi on 12 August, a month and a half after the latter was elected and a week after a militant attack in Sinai that had the military preoccupied, leaving the constituent assembly's drafting process unchallenged.

=== Tamarod campaign ===
The political roadmap proposed by Rebel's [Tamarod's] 30 June mass protests in a press conference last week [before the uprising] . . .:

1. Hand power to an independent prime minister who represents the January 25 Revolution on the condition that he does not run in the first upcoming presidential or parliamentary elections.

2. "The independent prime minister will head a technocratic government whose main mission is to put together an urgent economic plan to save the Egyptian economy and to expand social justice policies," . . .

3. "The head of the High Constitutional Court would be assigned the duties of the president according to protocol, where all executive powers are assigned to the prime minister in a six-month transitional period that ends by presidential elections judicially supervised and monitored internationally, followed by parliamentary elections," . . .

4. Dissolving the Shura Council, suspending the current constitution and drafting a new constitution are steps in the roadmap proposed by the newly founded Front.

5. The prime minister will give the National Defence Council the authority to fulfil its national security responsibility towards the country.

— Mohamed Abdel-Aziz, Tamarod co-founder.

Amid a climate of dissent and division, Tamarod (Arabic for "rebellion"), a grassroots movement, was founded in April 2013 by five young activists with ages ranging between 22 and 30 years old. They orchestrated a door-to-door, street-level campaign collecting signatures from Egyptians across the country calling for, among other demands, President Morsi's resignation, early presidential elections and the start of a renewed constituent process. Tamarod was supported by various opposition parties and autonomous social movements. The campaign, reminiscent of 1919's collection of petitions against British occupation, called for massive protests all over the country on 30 June 2013, which was the first anniversary of Morsi's inauguration, to create popular pressure on the government to see through their demands. The campaign's leading members Mahmoud Badr, Hassan Shahin, Mohamed Abdel Aziz, Mai Wahba and Mohamed Hassanein Heikal, initially unfamiliar to the public, started to continuously gain strong popularity among Egyptians reflected in the people's eagerness to publicly register their names, identification card numbers and signatures on the petition form. The movement was also intensifying its political activity, uniting all anti-Brotherhood parties and most political factions in its mission. Among the groups supporting it were the National Salvation Front, the Kefaya Movement and the April 6 Youth Movement. These also included members of the former National Democratic Party who, as stated by Mohamed ElBaradei, were allowed to participate as long as they weren't convicted of any crimes such as Morsi's 2012 rival candidate Ahmed Shafik who supported the protests. On 26 June, Tamarod launched the 30 June Front to administer the upcoming protests and to manage the transitional period following Morsi's ouster. This was in collaboration with a number of political movements and parties. Founders included Ahmed Douma, former member of the 6 April movement, as well as youth activists such as Esraa Abdel Fattah. According to the roadmap offered by the front, the head of the Supreme Constitutional Court will be the acting interim president and all executive powers would be handed over to a new prime minister. The demands also included the suspension of the 2012 constitution, the dissolution of the Shura Council and forming a committee of experts to draft a new constitution and put it to a referendum. At the press conference where the front was announced and in the presence of many prominent revolutionary and political figures, Mohamed Abdel Aziz, co-founder of the campaign, said:

We announce the 30 June Front as an initiative from Tamarod to represent Egyptians who refuse Muslim Brotherhood rule and to share with the great Egyptian people their political vision in order to avoid the mistakes of the past period and to continue on the path of January 25 Revolution"

However, the presidency and its supporters had a different reaction to Tamarod which was far from appeasing the population. A counter-campaign called "Tagarod" (Arabic for "impartiality") was started by Al-Gama'a al-Islamiyya member Assem Abdel Maged, who called on Morsi's supporters to sign this petition to keep the "legitimately elected president in his post". Abdel Maged's campaign however, proved unsuccessful in terms of impact compared to Tamarod which was able to penetrate and mobilize the "Couch Party", the silent majority of Egyptians who usually avoid participating in political events but prominently joined anti-Morsi demonstrations this time. The movement's effectiveness in sparking the uprising directly inspired many other copycat campaigns throughout the Arab world such as Gaza, Morocco, Tunisia and Yemen, as well as a new wave of protests in Bahrain.

=== Allegations of military involvement in Tamarod ===
Egypt's military had long showed discontent at Morsi's policies and viewed the political tensions between the government and its opponents as a threat to the nation's stability. This had come to light following a huge Islamist rally in support of the Syrian uprising sponsored by the Brotherhood in Cairo Stadium. What worried the army though, is that Morsi, while not explicitly calling himself for holy war, delivered a speech in which he called for a foreign intervention against Bashar al-Assad's government by establishing a no-fly zone over Syria. The military responded by issuing a statement where it argued that its only role is to guard Egypt's borders.

On 23 June, General Abdel Fattah el-Sisi issued a statement warning all sides saying that the army will not allow the country to fall into a "dark tunnel of conflict". He also added:

Those who think that we (the military) are oblivious to the dangers that threaten the Egyptian state are mistaken. We will not remain silent while the country slips into a conflict that will be hard to control

After Morsi was ousted on 3 July, most of the country's energy crises, that were very common during Morsi's presidency, were surprisingly diminished following the Revolution. David D. Kirkpatrick, Cairo's bureau chief of The New York Times, claimed there might have been a campaign orchestrated by members of the old Mubarak regime and top military generals that was meant to undermine Mohamed Morsi's one-year rule. Kirkpatrick also claimed that a smear media campaign against Morsi, that began immediately following Morsi's inauguration, helped feed popular discontent towards the authorities by adopting a contradictory stance through favoring the military while honoring Morsi's position as president of the republic.

Later in 2015, leaked tapes from the summer of 2013 that were later verified by J. P. French Associates emerged recording figures of the Egyptian military, including then-Gen. Abdel Fattah el-Sisi, suggesting Egyptian military involvement in the mass-protests preceding Morsi's ouster. In one of the leaked tapes the generals are heard discussing the withdrawal of a large sum of money for the army's use from the bank account of Tamarod, the independent grassroots group that was organizing protests against President Morsi. The tapes also suggest high-level collusion between the coup plotters and the Government of the United Arab Emirates as the money that is to be transferred from Tamarod's account into the army's account was provided by the UAE. The tapes were first released on the Qatari-owned Egyptian Islamist channel Mekameleen, a fact that the Egyptian government says discredits the tapes as fakes. American officials later confirmed that the United Arab Emirates was indeed providing financial support for the protests against Morsi.

== Issues ==
=== Economic crisis ===
During the recession in the mid 2000s in 2007–2008 world food price crisis, food prices skyrocketed; alongside Egypt's growing population this did not make for a good combination as Egypt was one of the largest wheat importers from nations such as Ukraine, price of wheat and food has skyrocketed as a result in these years which was a catalyst for this.

== Preparation and security precautions ==
During security measures in Upper Egypt, the Luxor security directorate announced that it had transferred all those jailed in the local police station to Qena prison as a mean of avoiding the 2011 scenario due to the risk of violence. Aswan saw heavy security presence and the police chief announced that he will personally head the operation room to receive complaints and information during the demonstrations and said that security personnel will protect their stations as well as state property, and added that the people will be protected, not the regime or any political party. Members of the FJP have gathered in front of their party headquarters to secure the complex. These procedures took place on 30 June, the day of protests.

According to information that came out after the removal of Morsi, officials claimed that Morsi stopped working at the presidential office as early as 26 June in anticipation to the protests and moved with his family to Koubbeh Palace, just a few blocks away from the main palace.

=== Fears of violence against Copts ===
Weeks prior to the protests, Coptic Christians, particularly in Upper Egypt, received threats from Morsi's Islamist supporters, pressuring them not to take part in the protests. Sheikh Essam Abdulamek, a member of parliament's Shura Council, said in an interview on television that Christians should not participate in the protests and warned them "do not sacrifice your children [since the] general Muslim opinion will not be silent about the ousting of the president." Letters were delivered to Christian families in Minya where they were threatened not to join the protests, otherwise their "businesses, cars, homes, schools, and churches" might "catch fire". The letters, signed by "People zealous of the nation", read:

If you are not worried about any of these, then worry about your children and your homes. This message is being delivered with tact. But when the moment of truth comes, there will be no tact.

There had been incitements against Copts by some of Morsi's staunchest allies. For instance, Al-Gama'a al-Islamiyya's leading hardline cleric Assem Abdel Maged directly threatened the country's Christian community by saying "if you go down into the streets on 30 June, you will bring black days onto yourselves." President Morsi himself invited Pope Tawadros II to a meeting at the country's presidential palace in what has been seen as an attempt to put pressure on him. The pope told Morsi to do what is necessary to bring the nation together and work for the peace of Egypt, not to stir up quarrels. "I am still hoping to see improvements in the economic and social life of the country," he said, while Morsi suggested that the church should advise Egypt's Christian community not to participate in the protests. Pro-Morsi cleric Safwat Hegazi addressed the country's Christians by saying: "You share this country with us, but there are red lines, and one red line is the legitimacy of Dr. Morsi. Whoever splashes water on that, we will spill his blood."

== Early events ==
=== 28 June ===
On Friday 28 June, protests against Morsi started to build throughout Egypt including in such cities as Cairo, Alexandria, Dakahlia, Gharbiya and Aswan as a "warm up" for the massive protests expected on 30 June that were planned by Tamarod. Pro-Morsi and Muslim Brotherhood supporters started counterdemonstrations at the Rabia Al-Adawiya Mosque in Nasr City.

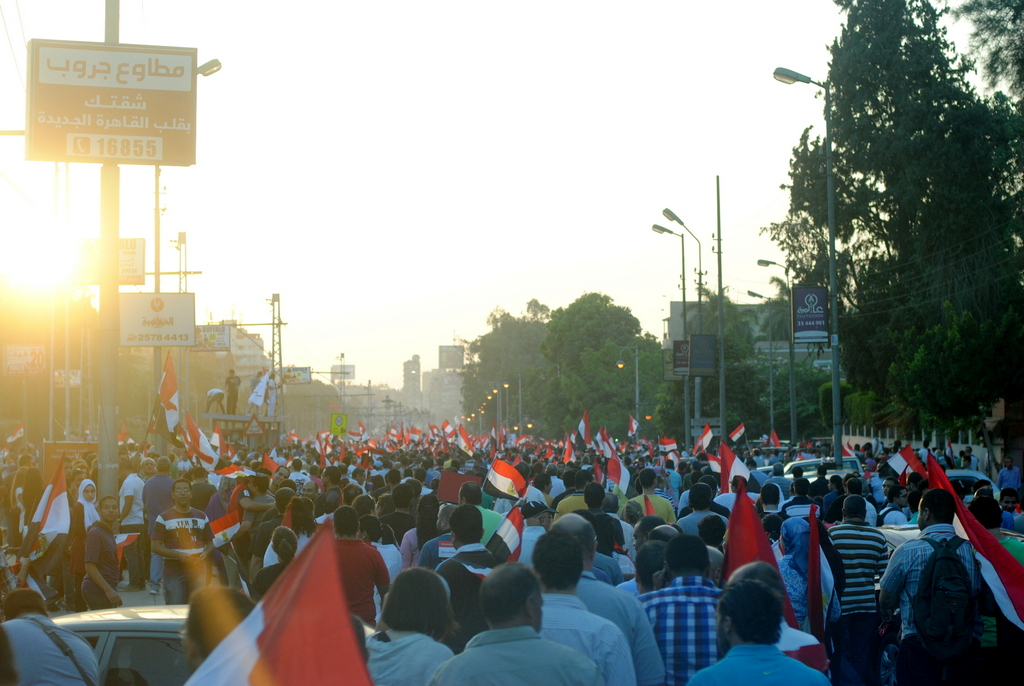
Anti-Morsi demonstrators marching in Cairo on 28 June

=== 29 June ===
Deadly clashes broke out this day in several Egyptian cities, most notably Alexandria, where armed confrontations between Morsi's supporters and his opponents, with both sides in the fighting armed with different kinds of firearms, left many injured and three dead, a 14-year-old boy, a member of the Muslim Brotherhood who was shot dead and an American student, Andrew Pochter, was killed after being stabbed in the chest during an anti-Morsi rally. Protesters stormed the headquarters of the Muslim Brotherhood's ruling Freedom and Justice Party (FJP) and set the building ablaze. In Port Said, a bomb detonated in the city's Martyrs Square where protesters had gathered to protest against Mohamed Morsi. The explosion, which AFP reported to have been a hand-grenade thrown by unidentified men, injured 14 demonstrators and killed a journalist. A police general in Sinai was gunned down by militants in an ambush when he was leaving his car, before they ran away.

In Cairo, the president's opponents started building up in anticipation for 30 June's uprising as thousands of anti-Morsi demonstrators took to Tahrir Square with the number of tents increasing to 150. At the presidential palace, protesters set up 18 tents and erected a stage at the entrance of Heliopolis Sporting Club. Five CSF trucks and a fire-fighting vehicle went to reside in the location as a security precaution. This day, Tamarod claimed to have collected more than 22 million signatures their petition calling for Morsi to step down. The numbers were announced in a press conference statement in which the group's leaders described 30 June protests as a new wave of the 2011 revolution that and stressed that "Morsy has lost legitimacy after millions of signatures calling for his removal were collected, and after he refused to respect the constitution and the law". The statement also urged protesters to remain peaceful. On the other hand, thousands staged an open-ended rally since Friday which was called for by 40 Islamist parties and groups led by the FJP and was held under the banner "Democratic legitimacy is a red line".

== Events ==
=== Cairo ===
The much anticipated day began with several marches throughout Cairo on Sunday heading to either Tahrir Square or Ittihadiya Palace with other comparatively smaller protests taking place at Rabaa al-Adawiya square, where pro-Morsi demonstrators were mainly centered, and another around the Ministry of Culture in Zamalek with artists and intellectuals staging a sit-in chanting against the Morsi-appointed culture minister. The 30 June Front announced that open-ended sit-ins have been staged in Tahrir and across the country until President Mohamed Morsi steps down and until the people's legitimate demands have been answered. Protesters started to fill Tahrir as early as 8:00 AM with streets emptied of traffic and nearly all shops were closed for this day. The people started chanting "Down, down with the rule of the Morshed (Supreme Guide of the Muslim Brotherhood)" and "He will leave, we won't leave". By 11:00 AM, thousands had already gathered in the square and organizers claimed in advance the support of millions to come. Two main marches that headed to Tahrir came from Giza. One saw tens of thousands rallying along Dokki's Tahrir Street and were joined by opposition leader Hamdeen Sabahi and prominent leftist filmmaker Khaled Youssef. It later merged with the other march in Al Nahda square near Cairo University and was led by Mohamed ElBaradei forming the bigger 'Mostafa Mahmoud march' that later reached Tahrir Square at around 18:10 PM while still stretching back into Dokki. Other rallies that also arrived in Tahrir are the Dawaran Shubra march coming from Shubra, the Maadi march whose participants first gathered in Maadi's Horreya Square, and several other rallies whether organized or individual ones including the journalists' march led by the Press Syndicate chairman Diaa Rashwan that began from the union's headquarters in Downtown Cairo. Later that day, the crowd in Tahrir Square has reached its maximum capacity of 500,000 demonstrators. This prompted other joining protesters to fill up the square's neighboring alleys instead such as the nearby Talaat Harb Street and Qasr El Nil Bridge.

A less notable sit-in took place at the Culture Ministry in Zamalek's Shagarat al Dur Street and was organized by artists, among them actors, musicians and painters, who were banging clogs and were led by some intellectuals, such as Bahaa Taher, who called for the toppling of the regime, and especially the newly appointed Islamist minister whom they accuse along with the Brotherhood of attempting to "Islamize" the country's cultural traditions. They later headed to the Cairo Opera House to stage public performances and manifestations and they were expected to continue to Tahrir but it is unclear whether all of them went there or if some remained.

In Shubra El Kheima, nearly 3,000 demonstrators, mostly women, formed human chains extending over one kilometer and were organized by the Popular Current and the Constitution Party. In addition, the April 6 Youth Movement and Constitution Party announced a sit-in in front of Abdeen Palace as soon as they received information that Prime Minister Hesham Qandil was there. Another thousand protesters gathered in front of the Qubba Palace only three kilometers away from Ittihadiya following rumors that Mohamed Morsi was residing there at the time, which was later semi-confirmed when the presidency announced it would hold a press conference at the palace later in the afternoon.

The satellite town of 6 October also saw hundreds rallying in Juhayna Square. Demonstrations have taken place in other similar locations around Cairo such as the wealthy district of New Cairo, where several dozens have gathered in front of Morsi's residency waving Egyptian flags and red cards calling for his resignation while security forces deployed barriers to keep protesters away from the building.

This day, the main opposition National Salvation Front (NSF) issued a statement it called "Revolution Statement 1" and which goes:

In the name of the Egyptian people with all their factions, the National Salvation Front announces public endorsement of the ouster of the regime of Mohamed Morsi and the Muslim Brotherhood," the statement reads.

"The Egyptian population continue their revolution and will impose their will, which has become unequivocally clear in all Egypt's squares."

"The Salvation Front also trusts that the Egyptian people will protect its revolution until peaceful transition of power is fulfilled...we also call on all political forces and all citizens to remain peaceful...and refrain from dealing with the failed Brotherhood government until the fall of this tyrannical organisation."

Although Morsi opponents had staged protest camps outside Ittihadiya Palace, one of the country's main presidential palaces, in Cairo's Heliopolis suburb two days prior to the revolution, the number of protesters was relatively low with only a few hundred demonstrators present at the vicinity around 5:30 PM, compared to the big masses staged in Tahrir Square and Sidi Gaber in Egypt's second city of Alexandria at the time. At the beginning, this was surprising to some commentators who considered the location to be a second focal point of anti-Morsi protests in Cairo along with Tahrir. Most of the palace's gates were left unguarded except for gate 5 which saw a high concentration of armoured vehicles and police was nowhere to be seen but three were reportedly arrested by night in possession of weapons including blades and firearms, according to state news agency MENA. By 5:45 PM however, demonstrators started pouring in with tens of thousands coming individually or in rallies such as the march coming from Saray el-Qubba carrying Egyptian flags, red cards and waving banners of previously slain protesters such as Khalid Said while chanting anti-Morsi slogans, most notably "The people demand the fall of the regime". At around 7:30 PM, the palace's surroundings were reportedly packed with protesters filling a broad boulevard for blocks and spilling into nearby avenues and Al-Ahram reported that the site was extremely crowded with even moving small distances taking a long time and according to the Health Ministry, one protester suffocated to death as a result of a crowd crush. The demonstrations' mood was seemingly jovial with fireworks keeping the atmosphere upbeat and protesters cheering patrolling military helicopters the vicinity with laser lights. MENA reported that political forces present there announced that they will stage an open-ended sit-in till the president steps down.

Only five kilometers away from the presidential palace, Islamist supporters of Mohamed Morsi and the government held their sit-in at Rabaa al-Adawiya square in the Nasr City neighborhood of Cairo for a third consecutive day. They called their demonstration this day "Tagarod" as a counter name to the Tamarod campaign aimed at ousting Morsi. The number of demonstrators was reportedly estimated at hundreds of thousands although the ruling Muslim Brotherhood-linked Freedom and Justice Party (FJP) claimed on its Facebook page that the number was four million and a Shura Council member of the party had also claimed that the number of people in Rabaa al-Adawiya exceeded the numbers of anti-Morsi protesters in Cairo and all of Egypt. The number however, could not be verified as some experts ruled it out and said that the square and surrounding areas could hardly contain such a number. Most of them chanted for the protection of the president's democratic legitimacy while some believed that the president needed more time to deal with the country's difficulties. The sit-in was prominently joined by the hardline Salafist group Al-Gama'a al-Islamiyya which called on the army and police to protect the president and, although initially wishing for non-violence to be exercised, threatened that if the police and army "fail to do their job in protecting the president's legitimacy … we will do so ourselves," said Mohamed Hassan, the group's spokesman while refusing to clarify whether he implicated the group would use violence or not and also added that Al-Gama'a al-Islamiyya would not allow the overthrow of the democratically elected president by any means. However, the demonstrations continued peacefully with no reported clashes occurring between supporters and opponents of Morsi either at Rabaa al-Adawiya or at the presidential palace.

=== Alexandria ===
Egypt's second city of Alexandria saw protesters gathering at Al Qa'ed Ibrahim Mosque, a meeting point for the city's rallies and also at the railway station in the neighborhood of Sidi Gaber. Hundreds of protesters had gathered by 4:35 PM, according to Al-Ahram, but in the following few hours the square started filling with demonstrators who poured in from all over the coastal city in thousands, including hundreds of lawyers and court room officials heading from the Lawyers' Union headquarters toward the station, chanting "Leave! Leave!". By approximately 7:00 pm, the vicinity of the station was reportedly packed and people could hardly move. A sit-in was also declared with a stage and tents being erected, including a large one near Omar al-Islam Mosque, as a preparation for the coming days. The situation was alarming though to political activists who organized the demonstrations in the few days prior to the revolution due to the violent clashes that erupted between opponents and supporters of Morsi resulting in a number of deaths including an American student. The city hasn't seen the kind of clashes it had witnessed in the previous days but the FJP however accused anti-Morsi protesters of rioting and of being behind the ransacking of their party's office in the Al Hadara district earlier on Sunday.

=== Other governorates ===
Nearly every governorate saw its own demonstrations with big ones taking place in several cities all over Egypt, including Mansoura, Damanhur, Mahallah, Suez, Port Said and Minya. In the Nile Delta's Menoufia, hundreds staged anti-Morsi protests in the city of Ashmoun. Some in other parts of the governorate have cut off the Cairo-Alexandria agricultural road while others have closed off seven city council buildings, among them Menouf's, with chains and signs reading "Closed by order of the people". Sharqia, where Morsi had lost before to his rival candidate Ahmed Shafik by about 160,000 votes in the 2012 election, had thousands demonstrating across the province with the capital Zagazig hosting several protests concentrated around the governorate building and in Orabi Square. The FJP office was attacked by armed assailants just hours after an Al-Ahram interview with the local party leader Ahmed Shehata when he presented his own version of Sunday's protests claiming that the number of "real revolutionaries" protesting peacefully that day would not exceed 20,000 across Egypt. The attack claimed the life of 21-year-old student Hossam Shoqqi, who had previously served tea for the reporters. Zagazig overall had a strong anti-Morsi sentiment already and was prominent with graffiti and posters slamming the Muslim Brotherhood. Gharbia saw tens of thousands of demonstrators in the capital Tanta. Several marches were delayed till afternoon prayers in Mahalla, known for its strong revolutionary spirit. But the city witnessed major protests and the numbers dramatically increased afterwards, with workers forming the majority of the protesters. Textile workers went on strike across the city, have previously warned several times that under Morsi their factories are threatened with closure altogether. The protesters chanted slogans like "Abdel Nasser said it before, the Muslim Brotherhood are not to be trusted". Prominent labour activist Kamal el-Fayoumi told Al-Ahram that "Mahalla contributed heavily to the removal of Mubarak from power, and we will do the same thing with Morsi". Hundreds participated in demonstrations in Kafr El Zayat against Morsi with anti-Muslim Brotherhood chants such as "National unity against the Brotherhood" and "You who rule in the name of religion, where is justice and where is religion?" The Dakahlia Governorate city of Mansoura saw hundreds of thousands continuously flocking in the city's main Al-Shaheed Square from several rally points. Chants included "Go, you're two-faced, you've divided the people in two" and the protests had notable persons participating such as Mohamed Ghonim, a leading Middle East urologist, in a different mass march in the city. Similarly to the events in Sharqia and Gharbia, the city of Desouk in Kafr el-Sheikh had demonstrators closing the city council building and the governorate complex. The protesters said the buildings would be locked down until the regime was ousted. This kind of action also took place in Beheira. Thousands demonstrated in Damanhour's main square, where some carried police officers on their shoulders chanting against the government, and marches in the city attracted around 30,000 protesters, along with 10,000 in Kafr El Dawwar and 5,000 in Kom Hamada. The port city of Damietta in the north was estimated to have several thousand demonstrators in the streets, according to a member of the Socialist Popular Alliance, with some in Al-Saa'a Square demanding early presidential elections. Around 250 fishing boats sailed in the Nile heading to the square using megaphones to chant anti-Mori slogans. They have taken over the governorate headquarters and the offices of the local educational authority and also planned to occupy other government buildings to prevent governor Tarek Khedr from entering his office.

A similar scene took place in the Upper Egyptian governorate of Luxor, where a flotilla consisting of boats and motor launches packed with people in hundreds waving Egyptian flags and chanting "Leave Morsi!" accompanied by drums, reportedly sailed down the Nile voicing their opposition to the president. Both river banks saw a significant number of protesters in a city that rarely witnesses unrest, with masses demonstrating across Luxor en route to one of their rallying points at the governorate building, where a sit-in was planned until their demands are met. There was a line of men on the corniche holding hands and making a corridor packed with women of all ages into the front, sealing off area of the governor's office. Luxor Temple was the site another gathering, where marches from Karnak, Sawagi and Awamea had met and the temple's exterior became full in the afternoon despite the stifling heat that day. 3,500 anti-Morsi demonstrators were reported in the city of Aswan south of the Luxor and Qena governorates. There were escalating verbal confrontations between opponents and supporters of Morsi in Aswan's main Shohadah Square as lawyers had gathered for a march heading to the square from the city court. Tamarod, joined by a number of parties such as the Wafd Party, announced an open ended sit-in and blockade at the government offices in Sohag. In the provincial capital's Culture Square, the city's largest, revolutionary forces have announced their intention to march after mid-day prayers. Shops were closed and the city's trading activity was relatively calm. The protesters chanted against the Brotherhood and called for national unity between Muslims and Christians while other marches were arriving from all over Sohag and from surrounding villages. On the other hand, hundreds of Islamists and their supporters gathered in front of the city's Korman mosque in support of Morsi. A near confrontation would inevitable between pro and anti-Morsi demonstrators if the police had not intervened forcing the Islamists to abandon the site for Tamarod. Tahta, another city in the Sohag Governorate, witnessed thousands in its main streets demanding the removal of President Mohamed Morsi. The governorate of Assiut, an Islamist stronghold which was the site of this day's deadliest clashes, a drive-by took place in the capital Assiut where it was estimated that more than 50,000 were protesting in the city by night. Gunmen on a motorcycle opened fire on a protest in which tens of thousands were participating, killing one person and wounding four, sending the panicked crowd running. The enraged protesters later marched on the nearby FJP offices, where gunmen inside the compound shot at them, killing two more demonstrators, according to security officials who were speaking on condition of anonymity because they weren't authorized to talk to the press. The clashes later escalated with protesters fighting alongside security forces on one side and Morsi's supporters on the other. Another deadly confrontation occurred in Beni Suef where opponents of Mohamed Morsi torched the ruling FJP's offices earlier in the morning, hours before mass protests were about to take place in the province. Nasser Saad, the FJP's media spokesman in Beni Suef, said that several protesters threw Molotov cocktails at the building's balconies around two o'clock in the morning before moving to a secretariat office and torched it too. Later that day, one protester was killed and 30 were injured, according to Beni Suef's security chief, when unknown assailants fired at anti-Morsi protests in El-Modereya Square. Following the shooting, Al-Gama'a al-Islamiyya claimed in a statement that the person killed was a member of the Islamist group while the office of Hamdeen Sabahi's Popular Current claimed that members of the "jihadist movement" in the city was the one behind the attack. The health ministry confirmed however that 25-year-old Ammar Gouda was the protester who died while participating in anti-Morsi protests. The army arrived to break up the situation and the demonstrations quietly continued later on. There were other violent clashes in the Faiyum Governorate in which hundreds of Morsi opponents clashed with his Islamist supporters outside the Muslim Brotherhood's local FJP office. Both sides were pelting sticks and stones at each other in the Al-Masala district and there were also unconfirmed reports of rubber bullets being used mutually by the clashing demonstrators.

=== Storming of the Muslim Brotherhood headquarters ===
Around midnight, the Muslim Brotherhood's national headquarters in Cairo's Mokattam district, whom Morsi's critics view as the government's real seat of power in the country, came under attack when anti-Morsi protesters started throwing Molotov cocktails and rocks at the six-story building's windows. There were also reports of shotguns being used from the side of the protesters according to the Brotherhood's spokesman Gehad El-Haddad who said that the attackers had been successfully repelled by the officials present in the building. This however proved untrue as clashes immediately followed the all-night siege with birdshot and live ammunition reportedly exchanged between the two sides. According to the Health Ministry, eight people have been killed as the rioting continued until next morning when anti-Morsi protesters eventually stormed the compound, despite being barricaded with sandbags prior to the attack, and the building was later ransacked and torched. Looting took place the next morning with rioters carting off furniture, blankets, rugs, files and air-conditioning devices among others. Fire was reportedly still raging from one floor as protesters tore down the Muslim Brotherhood signs from the building's front facade and another waved the Egyptian flag from an upper-story window.

== Continuing protests ==
=== 1 July ===
As the protests headed into their second day, the plundering persisted at the Brotherhood's headquarters compound, the site of fierce clashes the previous night. The protesters were already gearing up for new rallies this day, with some having spent the night in several tents that were installed in Tahrir Square and around Ittihadiya Palace. Protesters in Tahrir staged a sit-in around the Mogamma building and completely surrounded the government complex early in the morning, demanding the departure of President Mohamed Morsi and early presidential elections. Around 600 families who were affiliated with the so-called "Couch Party" staged demonstrations in the up-scale Greater Cairo district of Mohandessin, along with others in the El-Manial district in southern Cairo, calling for Morsi to resign and some brought sofas with them as a way of displaying how unashamed they are of belonging to this movement. In the evening, the band Cairokee performed for thousands of protesters in front of the presidential palace after receiving an invitation by volunteer organizers. They later thanked all the protesters who sang along with them during their performance. There have been calls by organizers for sit-ins at the Cabinet building, interim parliament, and another presidential place by the demonstrations' organizers, as well as other calls for nationwide labor strikes to pressure the government but there were no reported responses by the country's trade unions. Tamarod released a statement giving Morsi a deadline to step down until the next day at 5:00 pm, warning him they would hike up the demonstrations marching on all palaces and that he would face a mass campaign of "complete civil disobedience". They also requested a new presidential election as part of their declaration and called on the military and police to make it clear that they support the protesters. In addition, five cabinet ministers resigned in solidarity with the protests. They were Minister of Communication and IT Atef Helmy, Minister of Environment Khaled Abdel-Aal, Minister of Water Utilities Abdel Qawi Khalifa, Minister of Legal and Parliamentary Affairs Hatem Bagato, who had previously stated on Sunday that the Supreme Constitutional Court (SCC) cannot dismiss the president from office, and finally Minister of Tourism Hisham Zazou, who had previously submitted his resignation to PM Hesham Qandil earlier in June after Morsi appointed as governor of Luxor an ex-militant linked to a group that was responsible for the massacre of tourists in 1997, but later came back to office when the governor resigned instead. (Note: See) Also, eight independent parliamentarians from the Islamist-dominated Shura Council officially resigned from the body in protest and solidarity with the opposition's demands.

The Armed Forces renews its call and give the political forces a 48 hour ultimatum as a last chance to carry the burdens of this historic situation that the nation is going through.

The Armed Forces calls upon everyone that if the people's demands aren't set within the timeframe, based on its historic and national obligation it will have to declare a roadmap and procedures that oversee to include all mainstreams including the youth who started this glorious revolution without excluding anyone

In Assiut, thousands attended the funerals of the three protesters who were killed on Sunday during evening clashes chanting against the Brotherhood. The body of Mohamed Abdel Hamid, a director at the National Bank, was carried to the cemetery by hundreds of activists who proceeded in front of the governorate building where the confrontation took place the night before, waving national flags and calling for retribution. The funeral of the second victim, Mohamed Nasef, was marked by anger on the part of the family and tight security. The service for Abanoub Atef, the third victim, took place in the Church of the Resurrection, and was attended by a number of activists. The local Wafd Party held the Brotherhood and the Islamist group al-Gamaa al-Islamiya responsible for the deaths and injuries and accused them of encouraging their supporters to attack unarmed civilians under the guise of jihad for God. Supporters and opponents of Mohamed Morsi exchanged gunfire in Suez as the sound of shots rocked the city, while the governor of Ismailia, Hassan el-Rifaai, resigned from office.

=== 2 July ===
In Cairo, demonstrators were pouring into Tahrir Square, where popular committees were blocking all roads leading in and out of the already packed square after two major marches arrived from Shubra and Mohandessin. An artists' rally, smaller in size than the one from Sunday but still counting several hundreds, marched to Tahrir through Qasr al-Nil Bridge after gathering once again in front of the culture ministry. They were led by some professional vocalists into singing the Egyptian national anthem along with chants such as "Egypt is a secular country" and "Revolution continues". Mass rallies of thousands in Ittihadiya Palace's surroundings were peaceful and were jubilant as well, with men and women dancing to patriotic music. Al-Ahram reported that the numbers were bigger than Monday with an increase of tents in al-Merghany Street by the palace. There were also volunteer-manned checkpoints that have been tightened up since the day before, searching car trunks and women's purses. Tens of thousands have gathered at the Qubba presidential palace and the numbers kept increasing till the end of the day. Fireworks are lighting up the sky. At a nearby underground metro station, crowds were so large that the station workers have opened the metro barriers to allow people to exit easily. Groups of people wearing high-visibility jackets were spreading out patrolling the demonstration. Qubba's vicinity, one of this day's highlights, became a major location for protests only this weekend because during the previous months anti-Morsi marches usually headed to Tahrir Square or to Ittihadiya instead. The reason behind that is because the president moved from the Egypt's official presidential palace to Quba Palace, and as a result, the site became a popular rallying point for demonstrations during this uprising. Many protesters were chanting in favour of the military and General el-Sisi, as chants of "the people and the army are one hand" were very common and spray-painted "Game Over" on the gates of the palace. Another wave of resignations similar to Monday's included Foreign Minister Mohamed Kamel Amr who decided to step down in response to the unrest, along with presidential spokesman Ehab Fahmy and cabinet spokesman Alaa al-Hadidi.

This day saw significant numbers of pro-Morsi marches across the country as many started to suspect a Revolution would take place. Hundreds of Morsi supporters gathered in front of Cairo University in Al-Nahda Square as nationwide demonstrations entered their third consecutive day. The protesters, whose numbers were increasing, blocked roads leading to the front gates of the campus and erected a stage in a show of support for the embattled president's legitimacy following a statement issued by the armed forces on Monday. The rallies, along with many other similar ones in several parts of Egypt, were organized by Salafist groups such as Al-Gamaa al-Islamiyya which stated that pro-Morsi demonstrations this day would take place in 11 different governorates. Around Rabaa Al-Adawiya Mosque in Nasr City, the president's supporters gathered in their hundreds of thousands, a clear defiance of the millions of anti-Morsi demonstrators who gathered in dozens of squares across Egypt. In Upper Egypt, thousands of Morsi supporters prominently gathered in the cities of Minya, Assiut and Qena among others. In front of Minya's Al-Rahman mosque which is known in the city as an Al-Gamaa Al-Islamiya spot, thousands gathered in a march towards the city's Palace Square where hundreds of anti-Morsi protesters had been staging a sit-in against the recently appointed Islamist affiliated governor. According to Al-Ahram, a number of people from the pro-Morsi rally reportedly fired at protesters in front of the governorate building which resulted in a violent confrontation. Thousands of Morsi's supporters took to the streets in Sa'a Square in Qena in a rally organized by the ruling Freedom and Justice Party, along with their allies, Al-Gamaa Al-Islamiya, the Raya Party and the Homeland Party. Assiut's Omar Makram Mosque vicinity also saw thousands gathering in support of what they called "the present's legitimacy". At the same time however, hundreds of Morsi's opponents gathered in a demonstration in front of the city's governorate headquarters. Thousands of pro-Morsi demonstrators took over Sohag's Culture Square pushing anti-Morsi protesters to retreat into other streets of the city in fear of clashes. Protests also took place in the northern city of Marsa Matruh.

There were deadly clashes across the country, as the Cairo University demonstration in Giza's Al-Nahda Square witnessed a violent confrontation between pro and anti-Morsi demonstrators in the surrounding streets. Human Rights Watch reported that the clashes left 18 killed, 4 of whom were confirmed residents, and scores injured when, according to Muslim Brotherhood supporters, armed "thugs" attacked their sit-in as an exchange of automatic gunfire intensified after 10:00 pm. Residents acknowledged they armed themselves with rocks and knives, while Morsi's supporters acknowledged to have carried guns during the riot in the intersection of the campus' main road and Ahmed Zewail Street. Security forces intervened as a goal of restoring order but ended up clashing with Morsi supporters instead and teargas was used. There was conflict in another parts of Giza earlier that day, such as in Faisal Street where seven were wounded after their march was shot at from the side of Morsi's supporters. In the Imbaba district, gunfire was exchanged during clashes in Kit Kat Square using pellets and Molotov cocktails. There was one death confirmed by the health ministry and the injured were taken to hospitals in Imbaba and Agouza leaving the site of confrontation with rocks and glass scattered all over. Other parts of Egypt also saw violent clashes such as Agami in the governorate of Alexandria, where the police tried to contain the scuffles between pro and anti-Morsi protesters by firing teargas with the head of Alexandria's investigative department reporting 25 injured. In Qalyubia's city of Banha, the Brotherhood's FJP local headquarters was torched after it was stormed by anti-Morsi protesters. The building was ransacked and the banner that carries the name of the party was removed. Other clashes were confirmed in the Beheira and Luxor governorates.

==== Morsi's speech ====
Later that night, President Mohamed Morsi made his first official speech since the events began on Sunday where he appeared defiant to the military's ultimatum and refused to back down. He admitted that he made mistakes but insisted that he was the legitimate democratically elected president. In the speech he said:

The people empowered me, the people chose me, through a free and fair election.

Legitimacy is the only way to protect our country and prevent bloodshed, to move to a new phase,... Legitimacy is the only thing that guarantees for all of us that there will not be any fighting and conflict, that there will not be bloodshed.

If the price of protecting legitimacy is my blood, I'm willing to pay it,... And it would be a cheap price for the sake of protecting this country.

The speech was immediately denounced by opposition activists.

=== 3 July: Reaching deadline ===
Before the deadline passed, Tahrir Square was still filling up with anti-Morsi demonstrators with the central square partially full while surrounding streets were still relatively empty. It started to crowd however, and when the 48-hour period ended, Tahrir was completely packed with hundreds of thousands of protesters who were awaiting a statement by General el-Sisi. Protesters closed the gates of Tahrir's iconic Mogamma building in the southern part of the square for the second time since Monday, two days before, but reopened it on Tuesday. Hundreds of demonstrators carried a coffin representing President Mohamed Morsi in a symbolic funeral which roamed around Tahrir Square as three lambs were slaughtered representing Mohamed Morsi, Muslim Brotherhood Supreme Guide Mohamed Badie and Brotherhood deputy leader Khairat el-Shater, referring to "sheep", a derogatory term popular among Brotherhood opponents used to describe followers of the group in Egypt. The atmosphere was generally celebratory as the thousands of demonstrators were waving national flags and chanting against Morsi. Hundreds of women holding hands were chanting "Morsi, get out!", while they were encircled by a human shield that was viewed as necessary to curb the number of sexual assaults that were reported in Tahrir and its surroundings since the uprising began on 30 June. Anti-sexual violence groups such as Tahrir Bodyguard and Operation Anti Sexual Harassment wore recognizable neon yellow vests and helmets and were monitoring the scene. The vicinity of Ittihadiya Palace was almost full with people protesting against Morsi, as the band Cairokee attended the demonstrations for a second time since Monday's demonstrations in the Heliopolis suburb of Cairo and performed in front of hundreds of thousands of protesters cheering them, with lyrics such as "we are the people… and our path is right" and "you say 'justice', and they call you a betrayer". Several miles away from the presidential palace, anti-Morsi demonstrators started to congregate outside the ministry of defense building and were chanting patriotically. The group of pro-military protesters was building up until the much waited announcement and they had been holding a sit-in in the location for twelve days. 93 diplomats, some based in the foreign affairs ministry declared a strike as an objection to the "failure of the president to meet the people's demands."

Alexandria's streets witnessed protests in masses with anti-Morsi rallies marching along its main streets, including the seafront. Several thousands kept flocking into Sidi Gaber's station square, its surroundings and the Al Qa'ed Ibrahim Mosque in the city center, two typical rally points for anti-government demonstrations in the city. There were also tens of thousands of Morsi opponents who were stationed in the Sidi Bishr district's Mahatta Square calling for the fall of the regime. Clashes, however, took place in the neighborhood when Morsi supporters scuffled with the residents, leaving five injured. There were violent clashes that erupted in other parts of the city when a rally by estimated hundreds of Morsi's Islamist supporters, who were chanting "The people want to apply the law of God!", was intercepted by residents of the Agami district who tried to obstruct the march in objection to the demonstration's slogans. The confrontation left nearly seventeen injured and later required police intervention, the latter using teargas to disperse the fighting. There were hundreds of thousands rallying in Mansoura's Thawra Square, who significantly increased after el-Sisi's statement later that night. Protesters in the city continued to blockade a number of state institutions for a fourth consecutive day of their civil disobedience campaign. "The people already brought down the regime," protesters chanted, as well as "Mansoura will turn you back into a banned group". Damietta saw 10,000 protesters gathering in Al-Bosta Square since Sunday. In different acts of civil disobedience across the country, Kafr el-Sheikh saw protesters still besieging the governorate headquarters and announced their intention to keep doing so until Morsi and his Brotherhood-appointed governor resign. In Tanta, members of youth protest groups shut the gate to the Gharbiya governorate offices with metal chains, preventing employees from entering the building. In Menoufia, demonstrators blocked one of the city's main roads. In Sharqia, Morsi's hometown, crowds of protesters gathered outside the president's residence there, chanting anti-regime slogans, stating that they will start an open-ended sit-in until their demands are met, threatening to bring the whole city to a halt. Port Said witnessed protesters shutting down the Investment Authority compound.

== Coup d'état ==
On 3 July 2013, General el-Sisi led a coalition to remove Morsi from power and suspended the constitution. The move came after the military claimed their ultimatum for the government to "resolve its differences" with opponents was ignored. The military arrested Morsi and Muslim Brotherhood leaders, and declared Chief Justice of the Supreme Constitutional Court Adly Mansour as the interim president of Egypt. The announcement was followed by demonstrations and clashes between supporters and opponents of the move throughout Egypt. The military's action was supported by the Grand Sheikh of Al Azhar Ahmed el-Tayeb, the Coptic Orthodox Pope Tawadros II and opposition leader Mohamed ElBaradei.

== Characteristics ==
=== Anti-American sentiment ===
Since Mohamed Morsi's inauguration in June 2012, a sense of anti-Americanism grew stronger within a large portion of the Egyptian society that opposed Morsi and the Muslim Brotherhood. Anne W. Patterson, the US Ambassador in Egypt, was singled out during the events as the one to blame for allegedly conspiring to bring Morsi to power and for holding deals with senior Brotherhood officials. Patterson previously said that the White House supported Mohamed Morsi. "Some say that street action will produce better results than elections. To be honest, my government and I are deeply skeptical," she said. A number of prominent activists such as George Ishaq called her "an evil lady who is creating divisions" while Hassan Shahin, a co-founder of Tamarod, said that "America and the Brotherhood have united to bring down the Egyptian people". Morsi's opponents made a symbol out of her in the streets, reflecting their anger at what they believe to be the American government's meddlesome role in the country's affairs.

In Tahrir Square and other protest locations across Egypt, there were large banners expressing love for the American people but hatred towards the US administration. Anti-American posters were common among anti-Morsi demonstrators with some having Patterson's image plastered on banners crossed out with a blood-red X or smeared with insults, the most common being "Hayzaboon" (Arabic for "ogre").

== Solidarity and expatriate protests ==
Hundreds, Egyptians and Australians, took part in demonstrations against Mohamed Morsi in Australia's Melbourne where jubilant crowds gathered at the city's State Library before marching to the Egyptian Consulate. They chanted in unity for a better future. Another protest took place in Sydney, where hundreds from the Egyptian community gathered to protest against Morsi, demanding him to leave. The demonstration was organised by members of the Tamarod movement in Australia.

There were demonstrations in front of the Egyptian consulate in Canada's Montreal, where members of the Egyptian community in the city and their supporters called on the United Nations to publicly condemn the Muslim Brotherhood regime as well as policies of the United States, whom they accuse of supporting the "rise of political Islam" in the Middle East and of transforming the region into a den of terrorism. They also called on the Canadian government not to adhere to this position. Other cities such as Toronto, Calgary and the capital Ottawa, also witnessed protests against Morsi.

The French capital Paris, where the local Tamarod campaign claimed to have collected 1,800 signatures, also saw a rally joined by activists from diverse organizations protesting against Mohamed Morsi in the Place Saint-Michel and was organized in coordination with several revolutionary and secular forces in the city. The April 6 Youth Movement organized a demonstrations in the Place de l'Opéra, while another in front of the Egyptian embassy took place on both Saturday and Sunday. A rival demonstration however, was reported in Trocadéro in support of the president.

In Italy, anti-Morsi protests took place in five cities across the country: Milan, Rome, Bologna, Naples and Palermo. According to MENA, most Egyptians in Italy joined the anti-Morsi demonstrations and that the biggest protests were located in the industrial city of Milan where two demonstrations were held, one in Duomo Square and the other in front of the Egyptian consulate in Via Restelli by the Egyptian community ending at the city's central station. Another fifty people gathered in Piazza Duca d'Aosta calling for Morsi's resignation.

The Constitution Party reported protests in other European cities such as Denmark's capital Copenhagen, Sweden's capital Stockholm, Ireland's capital Dublin as well as several German cities, including the capital Berlin, where around 80 demonstrators gathered in front of the Egyptian embassy carrying red cards in a show of solidarity with the Tamarod movement. Switzerland's Geneva also witnessed protests against Morsi.

From South Korea, the Korean Confederation of Trade Unions (KCTU) delivered a message of solidarity with the Egyptian workers participating in the protests, where it said:"The struggle of Egyptian people is our struggle". The statement begins with:

We, the Korean Confederation of Trade Unions (KCTU) extend our warm hearted solidarity to the Egyptian Federation of Independent Trade Unions (EFITU) and all the workers and people of Egypt who took the street for bread, freedom and social justice.

Unjum Mirza of Britain's RMT Union gave a speech of solidarity with the protesters in Egypt on behalf of the union in front of the Egyptian embassy in London, where he was joined by nearly 200 people, in which he said:

I've decided to extend a very short message of solidarity from the Transport Union in Britain to the hundreds of thousands of millions marching across Egypt to bring down this corrupt Morsi regime

Hundreds of Egyptians raised their national flag in front of the United Nations Headquarters in New York City voicing their opposition to President Mohamed Morsi and the Muslim Brotherhood. Also, several hundred demonstrators gathered in Washington, D.C., in front of the White House. Many of them were young and chanted against Mohamed Morsi with slogans such as "Leave" on both Saturday and Sunday.

In Saudi Arabia, a number of Egyptian demonstrators raised red cards signifying their rejection of the government in front of the Egyptian embassy in Riyadh, while the embassy in the Yemeni capital Sana'a saw some of Yemen's political groups calling on Morsi to step down.

== International reactions ==
Supranational bodies

- European Union - The European Union released a brief statement where it says: "We call all political forces in Egypt to remain calm, avoid violence and start a political dialogue".
- United Nations - UN spokesman Eduardo del Buey stated that while most of the protests appear to be peaceful, "the reports of a number of deaths and injuries, of sexual assault against women demonstrators, as well as acts of destruction of property are to be strongly condemned."

On Tuesday, Rupert Colville of the UN human rights office read a statement. "We are following with great concern the extremely tense situation in Egypt and wish to convey a strong message of solidarity and support to the Egyptian people." ... "We call on the President of Egypt to listen to the demands and wishes of the Egyptian people [...] and to address key issues raised by the opposition and civil society in recent months, as well as to heed the lessons of the past in this particularly fragile situation," he said.

States

- Australia - While issuing a travel warning for Australians wishing to visit Egypt, Foreign Minister Bob Carr addressed the violence in Egypt. "Regrettably, there are also reports that Islamic extremists have threatened violence against Coptic churches and communities. We urge all parties to renounce violence in holding street rallies, and for the Egyptian police and military to exercise appropriate restraint in keeping public order," he said.
- Canada - Canada temporarily closed its Egyptian embassy. Immigration Minister Jason Kenney commented: "We're very concerned with the uncertainty that exists and that's why we closed the Canadian embassy for security reasons."
- France - French Foreign Ministry spokesman Philippe Lalliot called Egyptian authorities to listen to "the legitimate concerns" of protesters.
- Iran - Iran's government on Tuesday, called on the Egyptian military to support national reconciliation and respect the "vote of the people". "Mohamed Morsi is the incumbent president based on the people's vote," Iranian deputy foreign minister Hossein Amir-Abdollahian told the official IRNA news agency. "It is expected of the armed forces of Egypt that they play their role in supporting national reconciliation and respect the vote of the people".
- Israel - Israeli Prime Minister Benjamin Netanyahu told the Italian newspaper Corriere della Sera: "Like everybody, we are watching very carefully what's happening in Egypt". "Remember that for 30 years now we have had an anchor of peace and stability in the Middle East, and that was the Egyptian-Israeli peace treaty. We hope that peace will be kept".

Former Israeli ambassador to Egypt, Eli Shaked, said, "Instability is bad for Israel. Instability is bad for the Middle East." He added, "Even with the extremists in power, they have shown they understand the value, or the interests of Egypt."

- Nigeria - Foreign Affairs Minister Olugbenga Ashiru has urged the Nigerian community in Egypt to remain calm on Monday following the latest violence. "I am in touch with our ambassador in Cairo. We are watching developments carefully but there is no cause for alarm. I do believe that the authorities in Egypt will contain the situation. Also the ambassador is in contact with the leadership of the Nigerian community in Egypt on the need to remain calm," he said.
- Palestinian National Authority - Mahmoud al-Habbash, Minister of Religious Affairs of the Palestinian Authority, urged Arab Idol star Mohammed Assaf to cancel the concerts he planned for the West Bank stating that "certain conditions and developments necessitate that we delay festivities for two or more days". He also asked national television not to broadcast anything celebratory to show sympathy and solidarity with the Egyptian people. "I am worried about Egypt, and this worry is justified both politically and in the field. I am worried because Egypt is the heart of the Arab nation, and the army of the nation," he said. However, he made it clear that this was a personal stance not an official position.
- Russia - The Russian Foreign Ministry gave a statement in which it noted that all parties in Egyptian politics should refrain from using violence as it would "lead to further escalation" in the country. "We are fully aware that Egypt's contemporary issues cannot be solved unless dealt with through a legal context in order to ensure national unity and consensus on needed economic, social and political and reforms," the statement said.
- Syria - Information Minister Omran al-Zoubi said that the political crisis in Egypt could only be overcome if Morsi realises that an overwhelming majority of his Egyptian people reject his presence and want him removed. On 3 July, he called the Muslim Brotherhood a "terrorist" organisation and a "U.S. tool."
- Tunisia - Tunisian Prime Minister Ali Laarayedh said in an interview on France 24: "The possibility of an Egypt scenario is unlikely in Tunisia because I have great confidence in the awareness of Tunisians and their ability to measure the potential of their country".
- United Arab Emirates - Dubai police chief Dhahi Khalfan described the statement issued by the Egyptian military as "supportive to the people's demands" on his Twitter account. "Be with people, not against them, as only they can make the country stable," he added.
- United Kingdom - Prime Minister David Cameron stated in the House of Commons on 3 July that: "We should appeal to all sides to stay calm and stop the levels of violence, and particularly sexual assaults", and that it is not for the United Kingdom "to support any single group or party. What we should support is proper democratic processes and proper government by consent."
- United States - President Barack Obama remarked on 1 July in a press conference in Tanzania that "our number-one priority has been making sure that our embassies and consulates are protected. Number two, what we've consistently insisted on is that all parties involved – whether it is members of Mr. Morsi's party or the opposition – that they remain peaceful. And although we have not seen the kind of violence that many had feared so far, the potential remains there, and everybody has to show restraint..." The US government put on high alert around five hundred crisis-response marines who have been previously deployed in Italy and Spain in order to respond to the crisis in Egypt.

Others

- Human Rights Watch alleged there were sexual assaults during the protests. In the first three days of the month, women's activists reported 43 alleged sexual assaults of both foreign and domestic women.

== See also ==
- Abdel Fattah el-Sisi
- History of the Republic of Egypt
- Egyptian Armed Forces
- Egyptian Revolution of 1919
- Egyptian Revolution of 1952
- Egyptian Revolution of 2011
- 2021 Tunisian protests
