= Sporting (neighborhood) =

Sporting سپورتنج
- Neighborhood
- Location in Egypt
- Coordinates: 31.217793°N 29.932151°E
- Country: Egypt
- Governorate: Alexandria
- City: Alexandria
- Time zone: UTC+2 (EST)
- Postal code: 21617

Sporting (Egyptian Arabic: سپورتنج) is an upper-class neighborhood in the city center of Alexandria, Egypt. The area is known for its expensive real estate and for hosting the Alexandria Sporting Club.

Sporting is located in the Eastern District, sitting between the neighbourhoods of El Ibrahimiyya to the west and Sidi Gaber to the east. Administratively, it is part of the Sidi Gaber Section (kism).

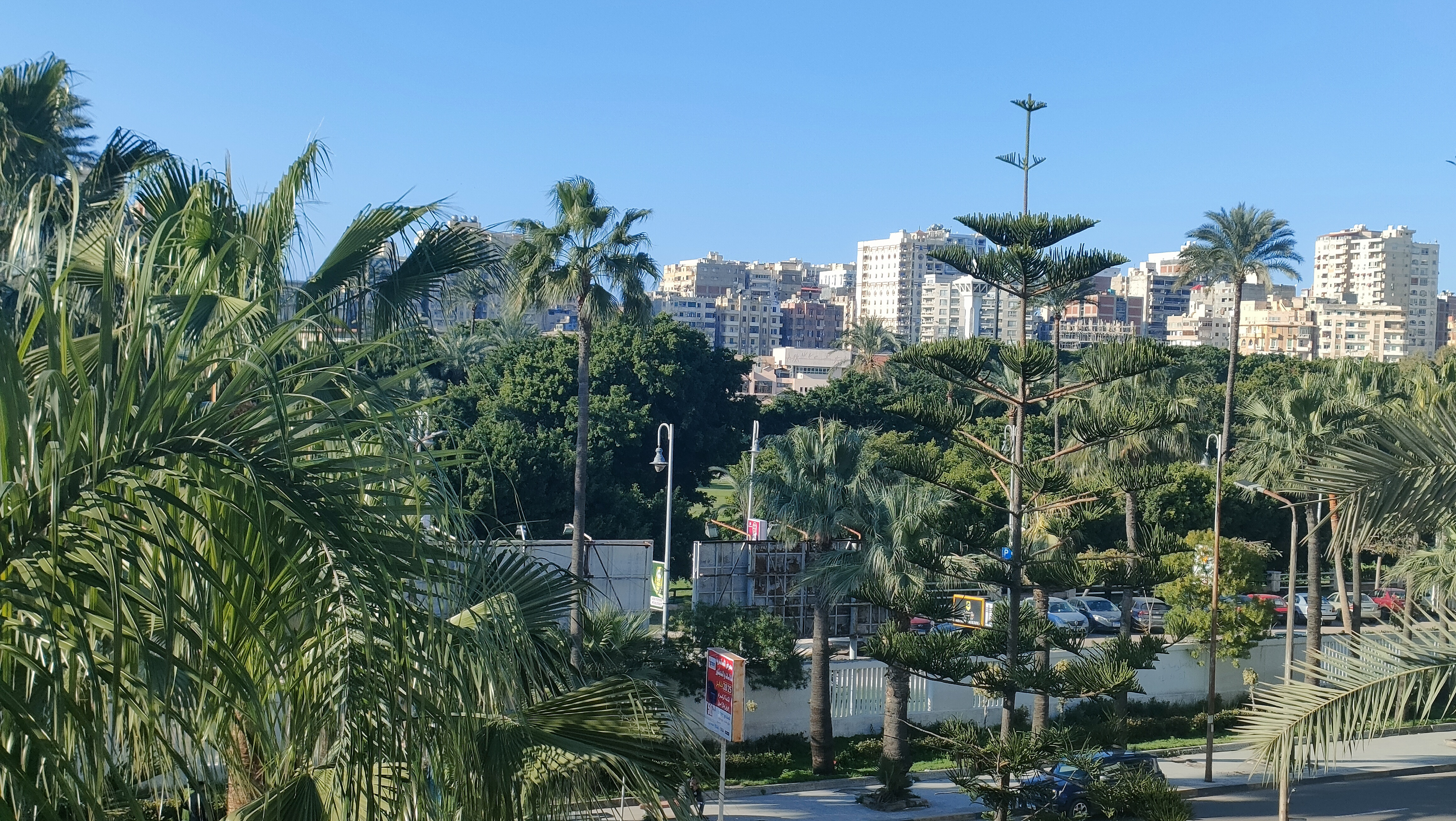
Alexandria Sporting Club, Sporting

== Transport ==
The Alexandria tram has two stops here: Sporting (Egyptian Arabic: سپورتنج), and Sporting el-Soghayyara (Egyptian Arabic: سپورتنج الصغيره, lit. Sporting the Small).

== See also ==
- Neighborhoods in Alexandria
- Sidi Gaber railway station
- Smouha
