= El Manial =

District of Cairo, in Egypt

Coordinates: 30°01′39″N 31°13′45″E

El Manial (Egyptian Arabic: المنيل pronounced [elˈmænjæl], "the nilometer") is a district of Cairo, located on Rhoda Island in the Nile.

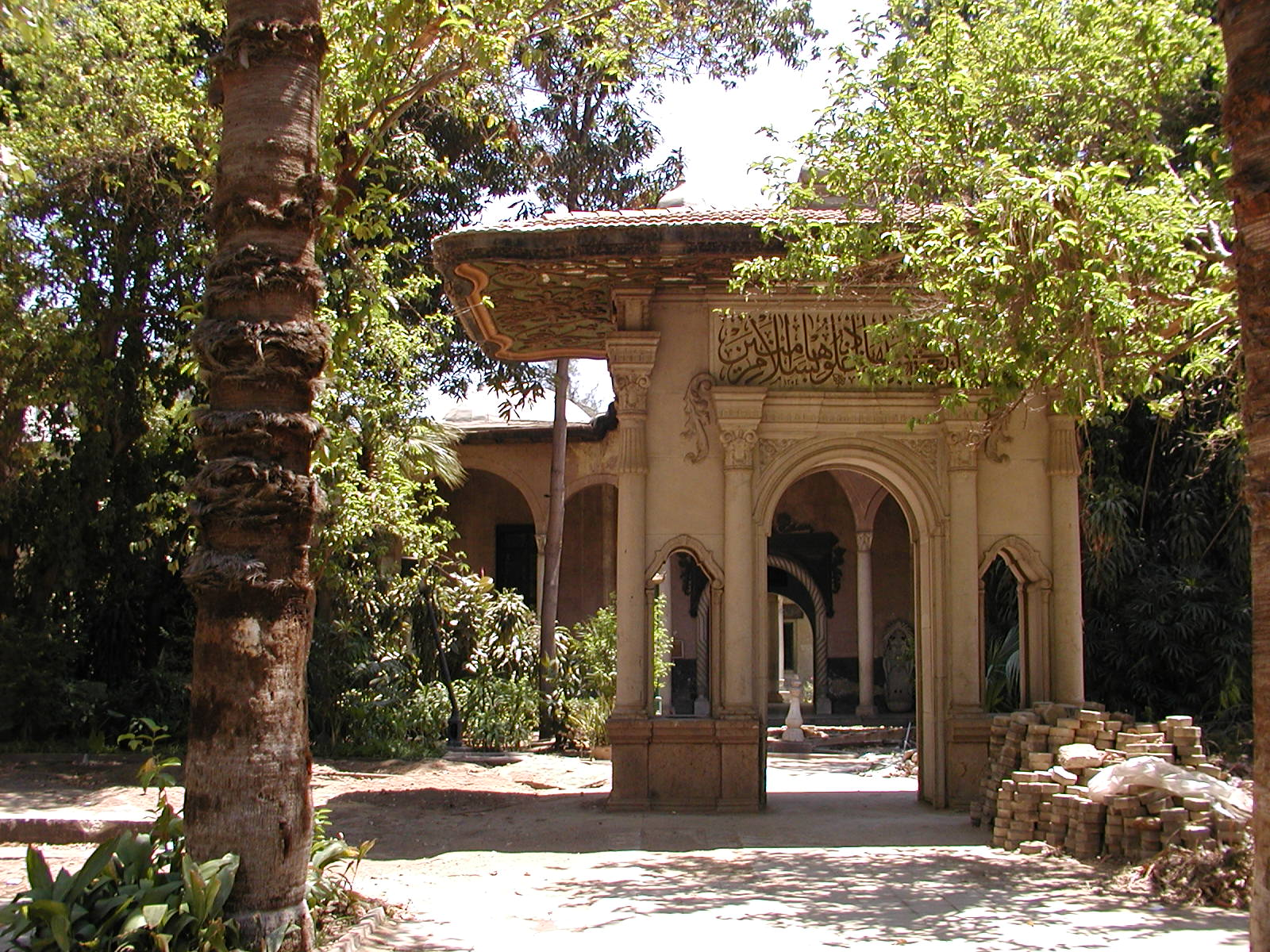
El Manial Palace entrance and gardens.

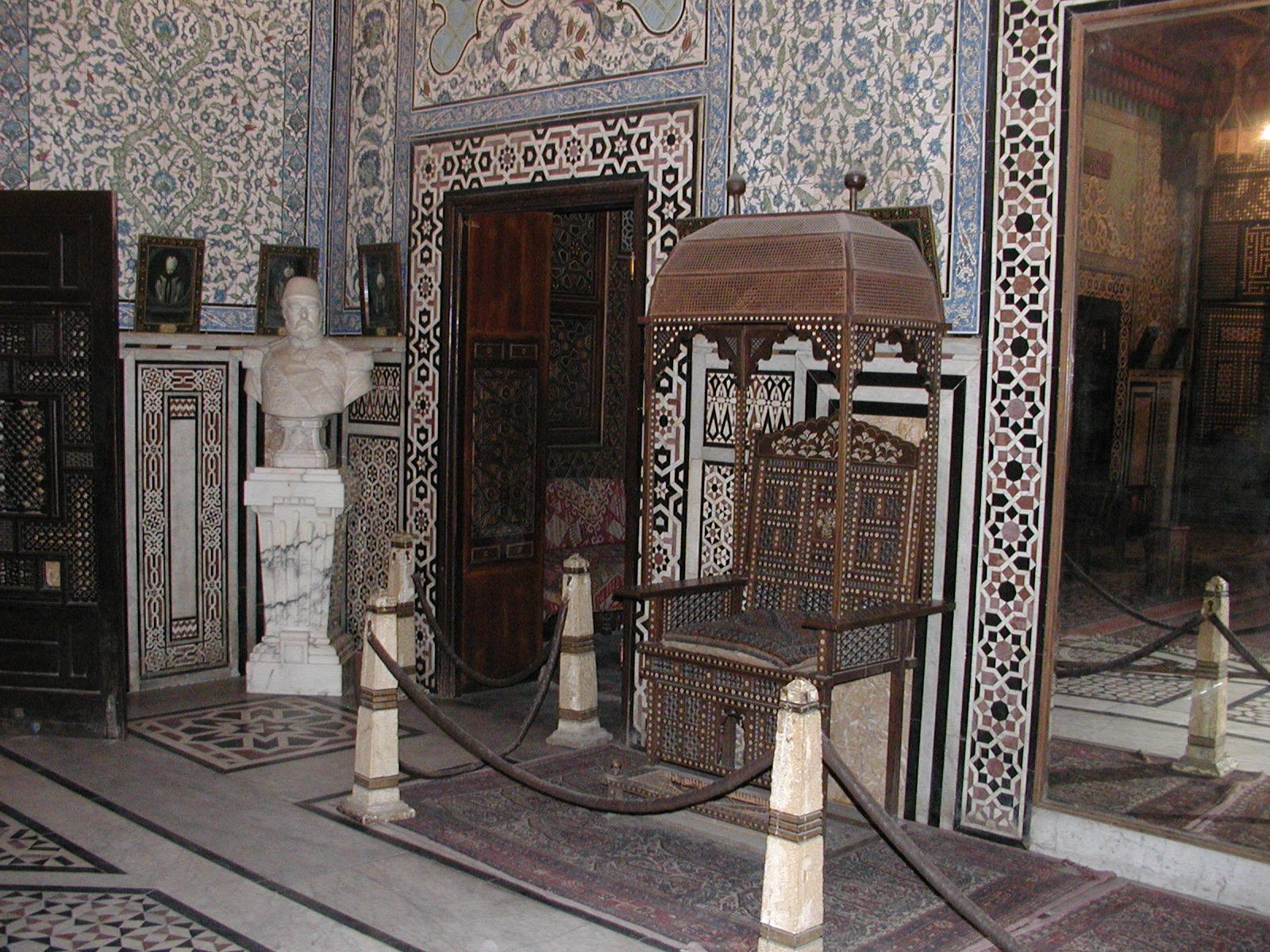
El Manial Palace Museum, the throne room.

== Prince Mohamed Ali Palace ==
The El Manial Palace and garden estate was built for Prince Mohammed Ali Tewfik between 1899 and 1929. The Prince is the first cousin of King Faruq and the younger brother of Khedive Abbas II Hilmi. The palace was given to the Egyptian nation in 1955.

=== El Manial Palace Museum ===
The complex consists of six structures. Among these structures is a museum in which Faruq's hunting trophies are found, the prince's residence and furnishings and a museum in which some of the family's memorabilia are found. The palace also includes a collection of manuscripts, carpets, textiles, brass work and crystal. Items that can be seen here are a table made of elephant ears and a 1000-piece silver service.

On part of the original grounds a hotel has been built called the Meridian Hotel. The remaining palace gardens have beautiful plants and flowers in an expansive setting fronting a small branch of the Nile.

== Al Ainy Palace ==
The Al Ainy Palace was built in 1466-68 A.D. by Ahmed Ibn Al Ainy. It was used as a government building, a chateau, a military hospital and a primary school. Since 1837 the Al Ainy Palace or Qasr Al Ainy (Kasr AlAiny) has been a medical school and it is now the Faculty of Medicine of Cairo University. It has an area of about 44 acres in the northern part of El Manial island, across from El Manial Palace. It is different from the new Kasr Al Ainy Teaching (French) hospital, across the bridge on Cairo side.

== See also ==
- Manasterly Palace
- Qasr Al Ainy
- Palaces in Cairo
