= Evelyn Wellings =

Egyptian-born English cricketer and journalist

Lyn Wellings

Personal information
- Full name: Evelyn Maitland Wellings
- Born: 6 April 1909; Sidi Gaber, Alexandria, Egypt
- Died: 10 September 1992 (aged 83); Basingstoke, Hampshire, England
- Batting: Right-handed
- Bowling: Right-arm off-spin

Domestic team information
- Years: Team
- 1928 – 1931: Oxford University
- 1931: Surrey

Career statistics
Competition	First-class
Matches	36
Runs scored	836
Batting average	20.39
100s/50s	1/4
Top score	125
Balls bowled	7226
Wickets	108
Bowling average	30.14
5 wickets in innings	5
10 wickets in match	0
Best bowling	6/75
Catches/stumpings	10/–
- Source: Cricinfo, 25 January 2017

Evelyn Maitland "Lyn" Wellings (6 April 1909 – 10 September 1992) was an Egyptian-born English cricketer and journalist, who played for Oxford University and Surrey.

== Life and career ==
Lyn Wellings was born in Alexandria, Egypt, where his father was a tea merchant. He was sent to England for his education at the age of six, beginning at a prep school in Bournemouth and going on to Cheltenham College and Christ Church, Oxford, where he studied Classics. At Oxford, he won blues for cricket and golf.

He had his most successful cricket season in 1931, taking 52 wickets with his off-spin at an average of 27.57. At the start of the season he took his best first-class figures of 6 for 75 against Leicestershire, and in the final match he took seven wickets when Oxford beat Cambridge in the University Match at Lord's.

After a brief period as a schoolmaster, Wellings became a trenchant cricket correspondent, usually with the by-line E. M. Wellings, writing for the Daily Mirror and the London Evening News, the latter between 1938 and 1973, with the exception of war service in the Honourable Artillery Company. He wrote the annual review of Public Schools cricket in Wisden from 1945 to 1972.

Ian Wooldridge said that Wellings "dipped his pen in vitriol". His Wisden obituary noted that he attacked one-day cricket, overseas players in county teams, faulty technique, the isolation of South African cricket, and anything to do with the Test and County Cricket Board, and that "the tone of his argument was so forceful that it usually upset more people than it won over". David Frith, however, defended Wellings, saying that "his attacks on the game's adverse trends and ill-conceived pieces of administration were the compulsion of a man whose regard for cricket was unusually deep", and came from someone who had himself played the game well and was "an outstanding analyst". Frith added, "Wellings gave every impression of enjoying his infamous reputation."

== Books ==
- No Ashes for England 1951
- Meet the Australians 1953
- The Ashes Retained 1955
- The Ashes Thrown Away: The M.C.C. Tour of Australia 1958-59 1959
- Dexter versus Benaud: M.C.C. Tour of Australia 1962-3 1963
- Simpson's Australians: The England Tour 1964 1964
- A History of County Cricket: Middlesex 1972
- Vintage Cricketers 1983
