= Roda Island =

Island in Cairo, Egypt

Native name: جزيرة الروضة
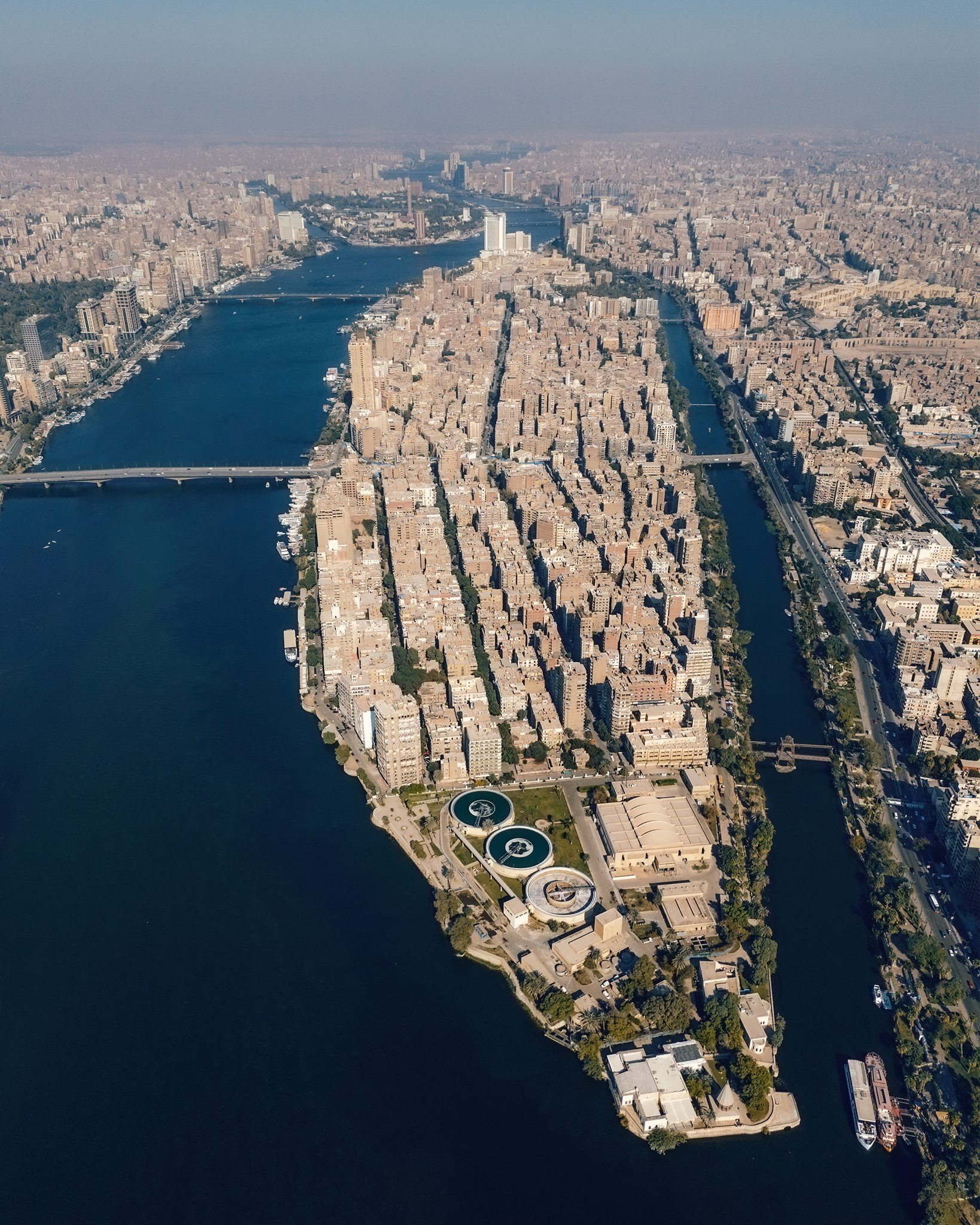
- Aerial view of the Roda Island

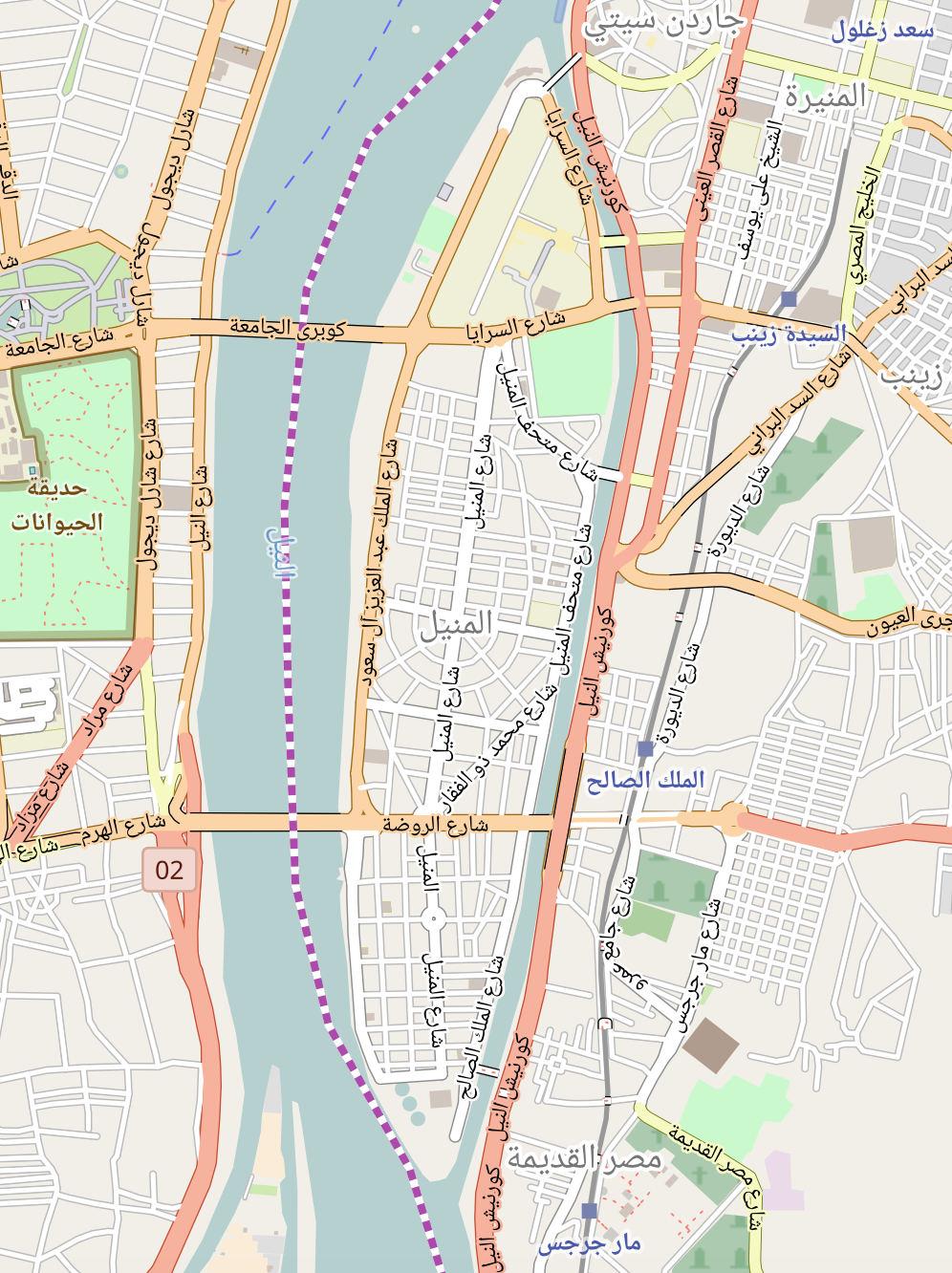
- OpenStreetMap rendering of Roda Island

Geography
- Location: Nile River, Cairo
- Coordinates: 30°01′15″N 31°13′32″E

Administration
- Egypt

Roda Island (or Rawdah Island, Arabic: جزيرة الروضة, romanized: Jazīrat ar-Rawdah, [ɡɪˈziːɾɪt eɾˈɾoːdɑ]) is an island neighbourhood on the Nile in central Cairo, alternatively known as Manial al-Roda, or al-Manial, referring to the main village that existed on the island before it was urbanised, and is part of the Old Cairo district.

== History ==
The island was known in Antiquity as Babylonian Island (Ancient Greek: Νῆσος Βαβυλῶνος), referring to the Babylon Fortress.

During the reign of caliph Sulaymān ibn ʿAbd al-Malik of the Umayyad dynasty, a nilometer was built on the southern tip of the island opposite the mouth of the Khalij canal in AD 715 to measure the annual Nile flood. The structure was replaced in AD 861, during the reign of the Abbasid caliph al-Mutawakkil, overseen by the astronomer Alfraganus, and despite a number of modifications, is still extant today and known as the Roda Island Nilometer.

The Ayyubid Sultan as-Salih Ayyub (reigned 1240 to 1249, great-nephew of Saladin) built a palace at the southern tip of the island near the nilometer.

The Mamluk Bahri dynasty originally settled on Roda Island at the palace. The name of the dynasty, "Bahriyya", means 'of the river', referring to their original settlement on the island on the Nile.

The Bostan al-Kebir (Great Gardens) started to be planned and grown on the island in 1829 by Viceroy Ibrahim Pasha, of the Muhammad Ali Dynasty. In 1851 the Manasterly Palace, also known as the Kiosk, was built on the island's southern tip on the ruins of the Ayyubid palace for Hassan Fouad Pasha Al-Manasterly, Katkhoda of Egypt during the reign of Abbas I. Later in the early 20th century the Prince Muhammad Ali Palace was built in the island's mid-north.

Today, the island is a bustling neighbourhood in Cairo.

== Gallery ==
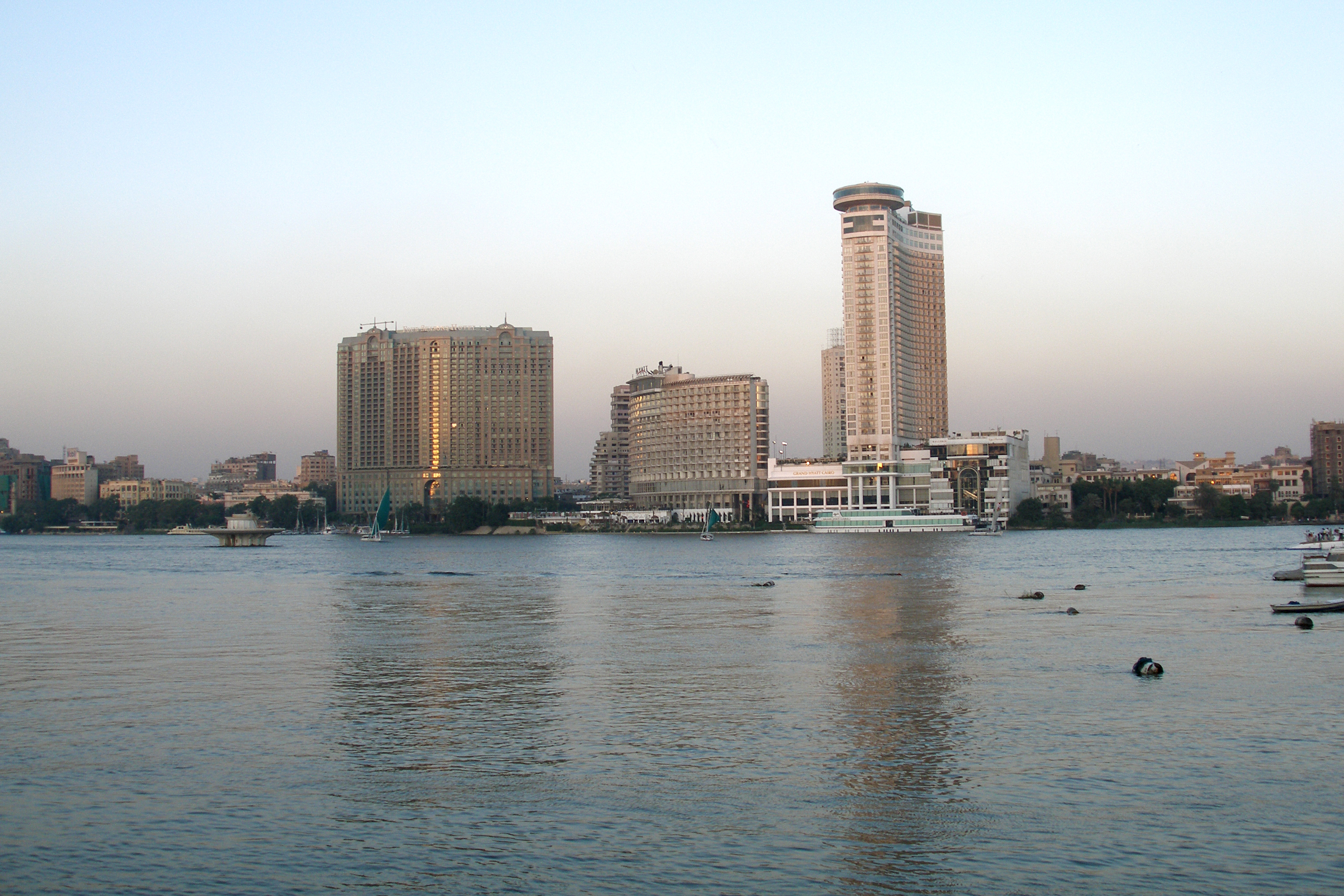
Northern tip

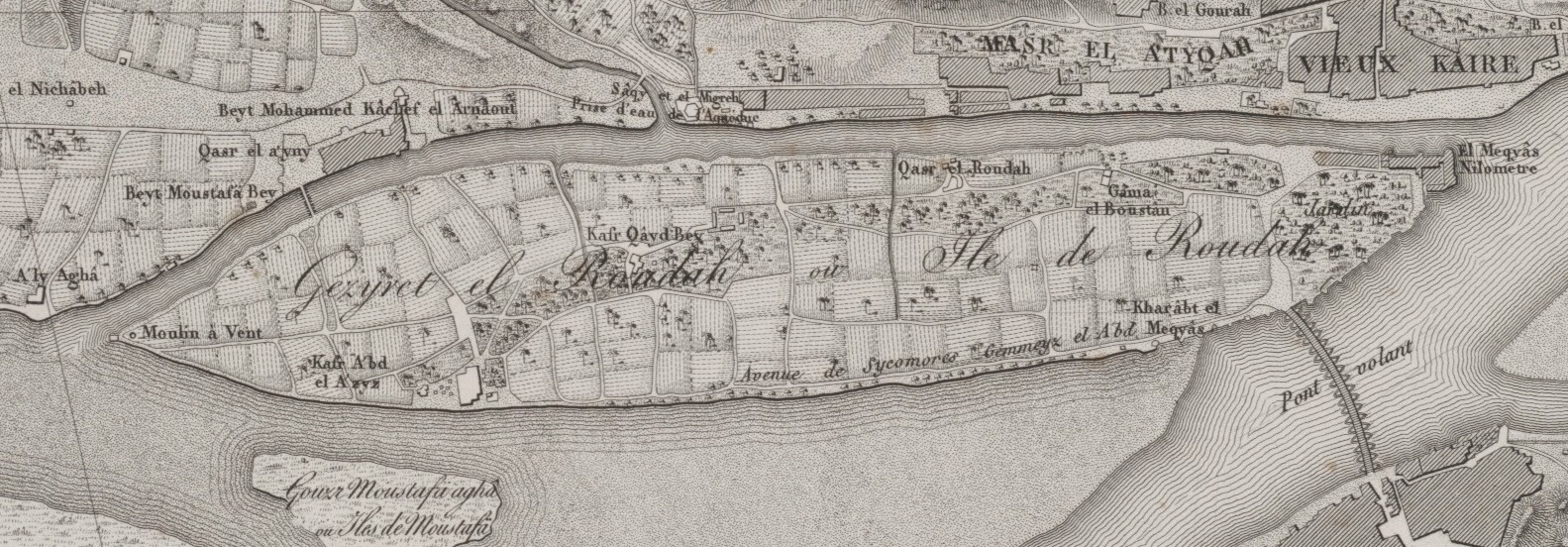
c.1800 map of Roda Island

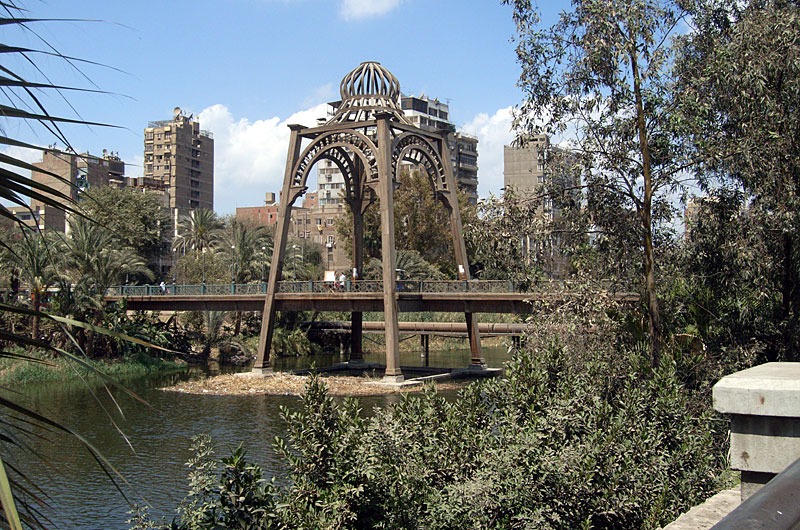
Wooden bridge near the Nilometer

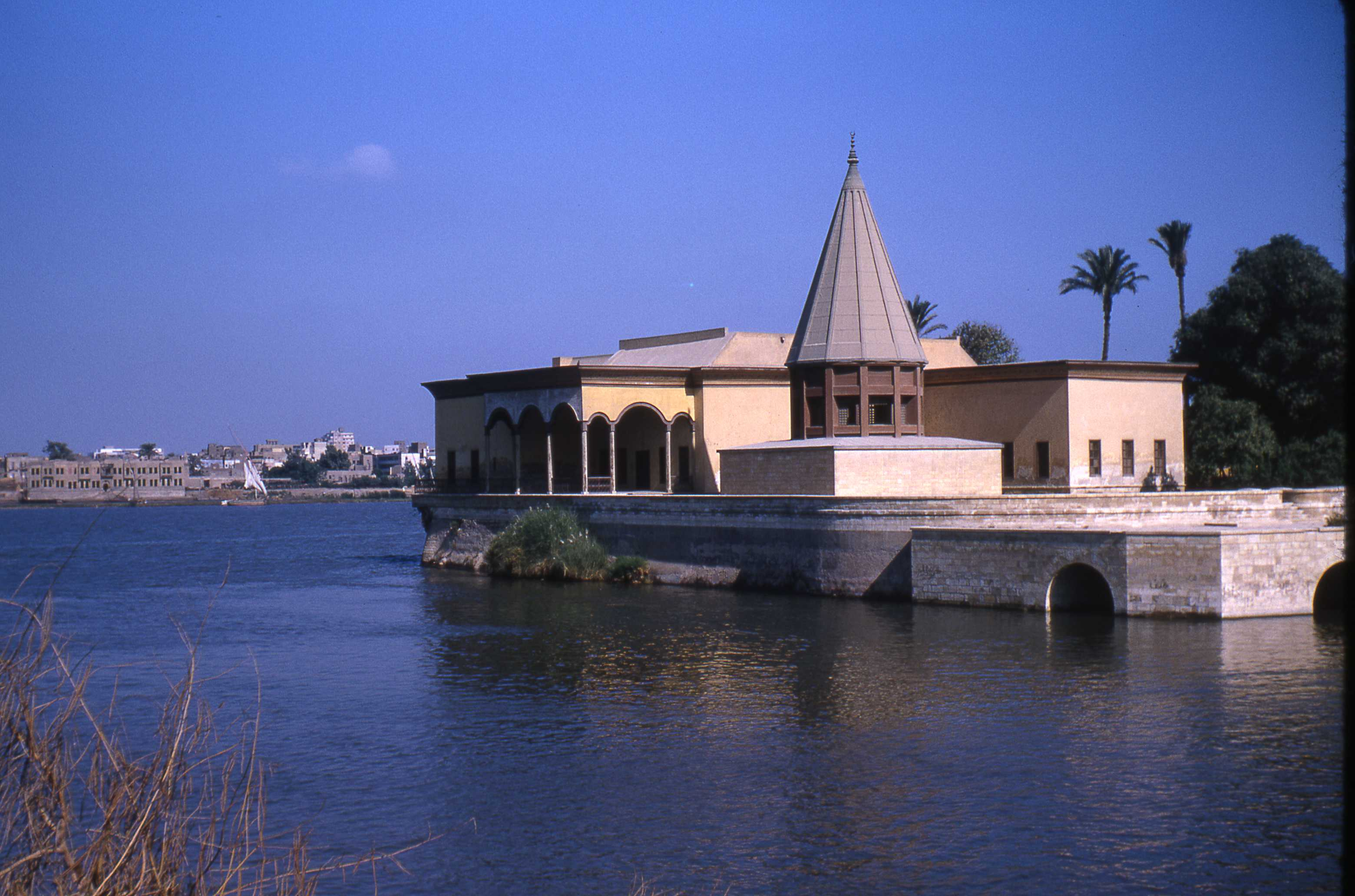
The Roda Island Nilometer, and island in the Nile

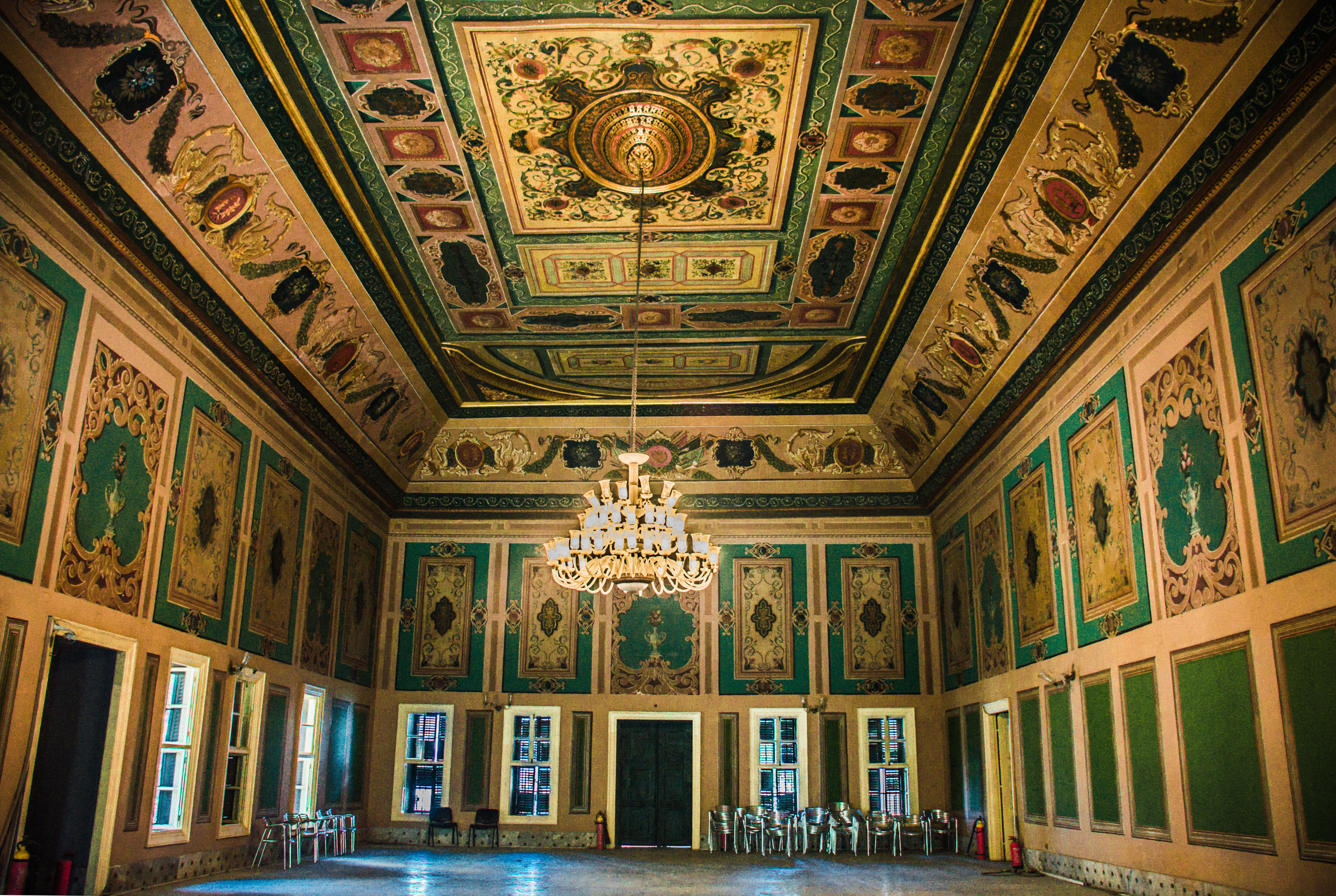
The Manasterly Palace
