= Manasterly Palace =

Palace in Cairo, Egypt

Coordinates: 30.0070°N 31.2247°E

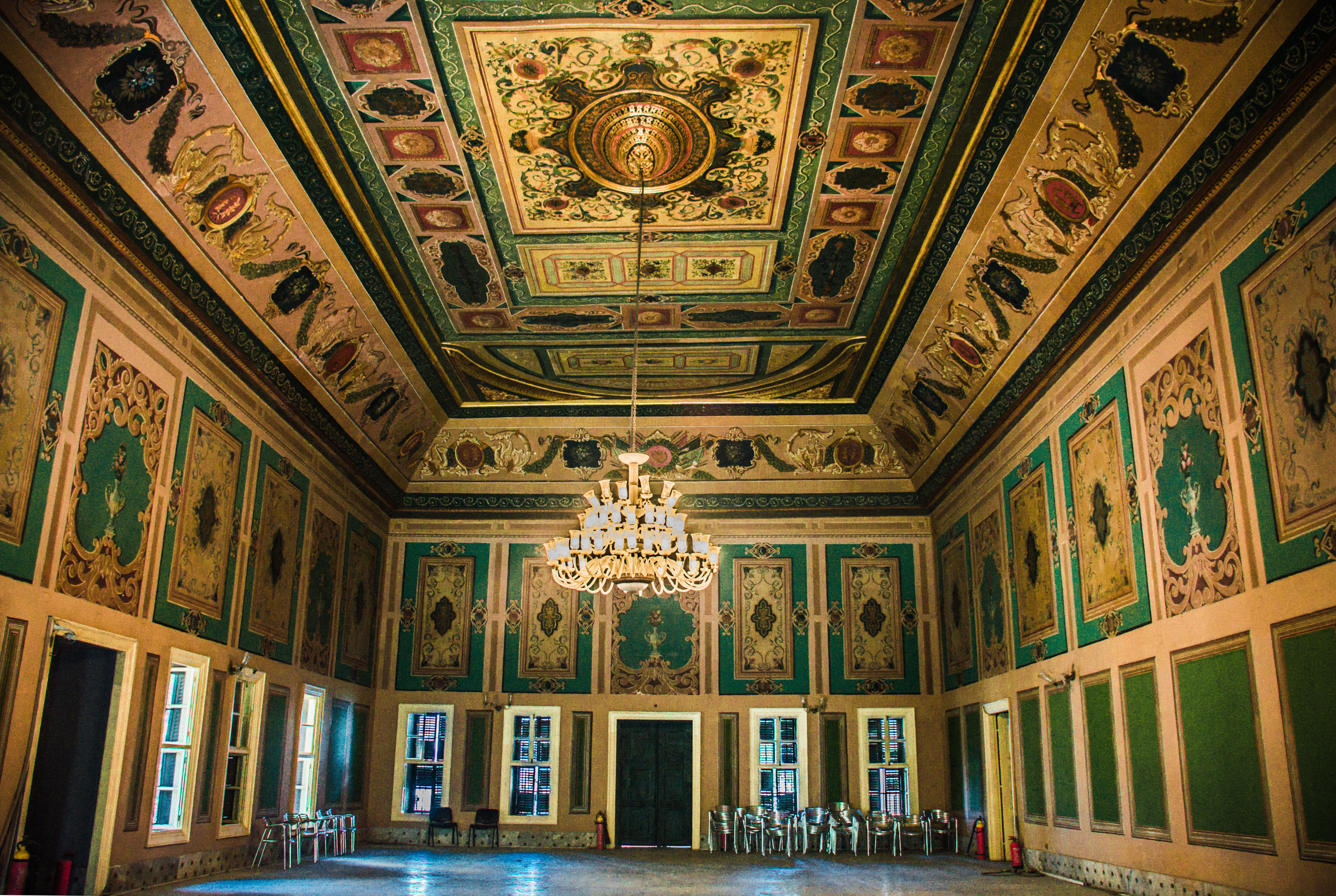
- Main hall of the Palace
- Interactive map of the Manasterly Palace area

The Manasterly Palace is an Ottoman Baroque palace and grounds in the south western corner on the southern end of Rawda Island on the Nile in Cairo, Egypt. It stands next to the nilometer that dates back to 861 CE.

The one story palace was built in 1851 by Hassan Fouad Pasha al-Manasterly, then Governor of Cairo. Only the public halls (selamlik) of the governor's palace are still standing while his private residence (harem) has been demolished to make way for a water station.

== Present use ==
The palace houses the International Music Centre, which holds musical events over the year.

== Architecture ==
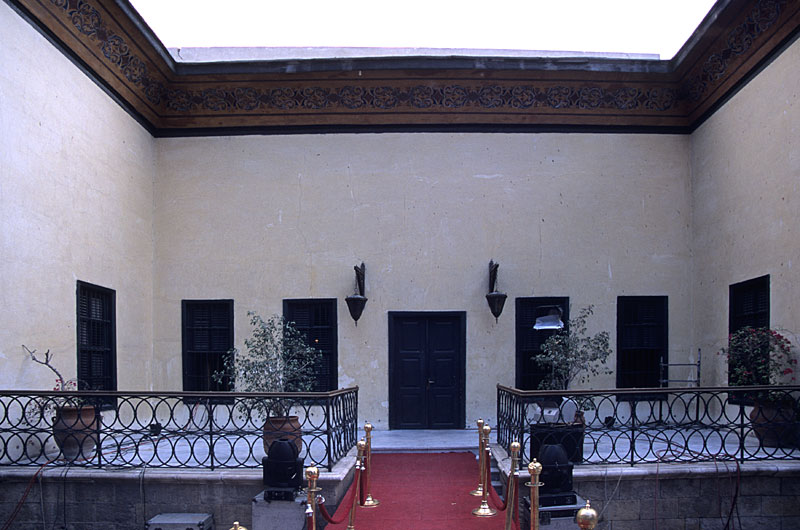
Main entrance

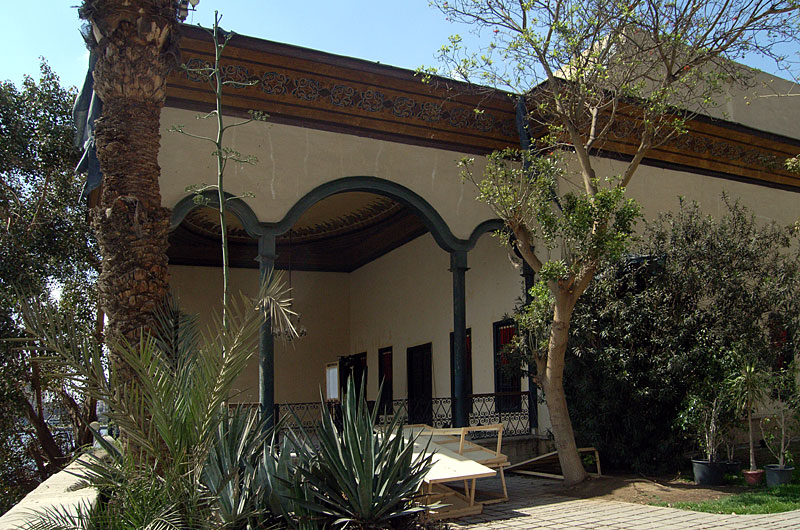
Terrace

The palace, consisting of a main rectangular hall which opens to the outside through a door preceded by a marble case. A second hall is located to the west of the main hall. Adjacent to this hall lie two rectangular rooms with attached bathrooms. A terrace overlooking the Nile surrounds the building from the west and intersects in the end with another terrace.

The palace is famous for its beautiful decorative style and wooden architecture design. Its walls and ceilings are garnished with plaster and colored greenery ornaments and bird figures. The floors of the two main halls are covered with marble and parquet. The influence of the Ottoman Rococo is quite notable as well as a Pharonic impact at the external entry-front of the palace.
