= Couch Party =

Couch Party (Arabic: حزب الكنبة, ALA-LC: Ḥizb al-Kanabah) is a political term widely used in Egyptian politics referring to the millions of Egyptians who avoid participating in protests and have no political affiliation. It started to appear during and after the 2011 revolution that toppled President Hosni Mubarak. People who self-describe or are described by others as belonging to this imaginary "party" have been the target of many political forces in the country due to their number that could easily influence electoral process by changing the balance in favor of a particular vote. Many have accused them of being supportive of Mubarak's regime and were displeased with the demonstrations against him, while others said they supported anti-regime protests but chose to watch the events on television instead of participating. The general description however, is that they are the silent majority that either opposes all political entities or prefers to follow events while isolating itself without taking part in any political process the country goes through. Despite this, some of those described as being part of the Couch Party made their first move during the June 2013 Egyptian protests with masses rarely taking to the streets against newly elected President Mohamed Morsi and called for his resignation following his temporary constitutional declaration of 22 November 2012 which sparked months of protests. Many of them simply say they want stability in their country and call for an end to the economic downfall and the rise of criminal activity which became rampant following Mubarak's resignation.
