= Nilometer =

Structure for measuring the Nile River's clarity and water level

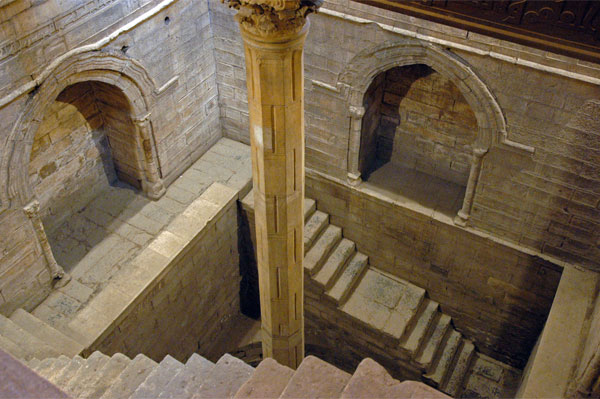
Measuring shaft of the nilometer on Roda Island, Cairo built in 861 AD on the orders of the Abbasid Caliph al-Mutawakkil

A nilometer is a structure for measuring the Nile River's clarity and water level during the annual flood season in Egypt. There were three main types of nilometers, calibrated in Egyptian cubits: (1) a vertical column, (2) a corridor stairway of steps leading down to the Nile, and (3) a deep well with a culvert. If the water level was low, the fertility of the floodplain would suffer. If it was too high, the flooding would be destructive. There was a specific mark that indicated how high the flood should be if the fields were to get good soil.

Nilometers originated in pharaonic times, were also built in Roman times, and were highly prevalent in Islamic Egypt in Rashidun, Umayyad, Abbasid, Tulunid, Mamluk, Alawiyya and Republican periods, until the Aswan Dam rendered them obsolete in the 1960s.

== Description ==
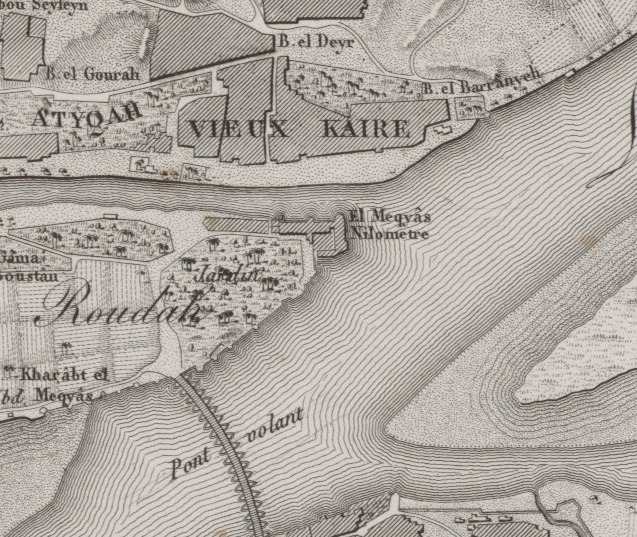
Nilometer shown c.1800 at the southern tip of Roda Island

Between July and November, the reaches of the Nile running through Egypt would burst their banks and cover the adjacent floodplain. When the waters receded, around September or October, they left behind a rich alluvial deposit of exceptionally fertile black silt over the croplands. The akhet, or Season of the Inundation, was one of the three seasons into which the ancient Egyptians divided their year.

The annual flood was of great importance to Egyptian civilization. A moderate inundation was a vital part of the agricultural cycle; however, a lighter inundation than normal would cause famine, and too much flood water would be equally disastrous, washing away much of the infrastructure built on the flood plain. Records from AD 622–999 indicate that, on average, 28% of the years saw an inundation that fell short of expectations.

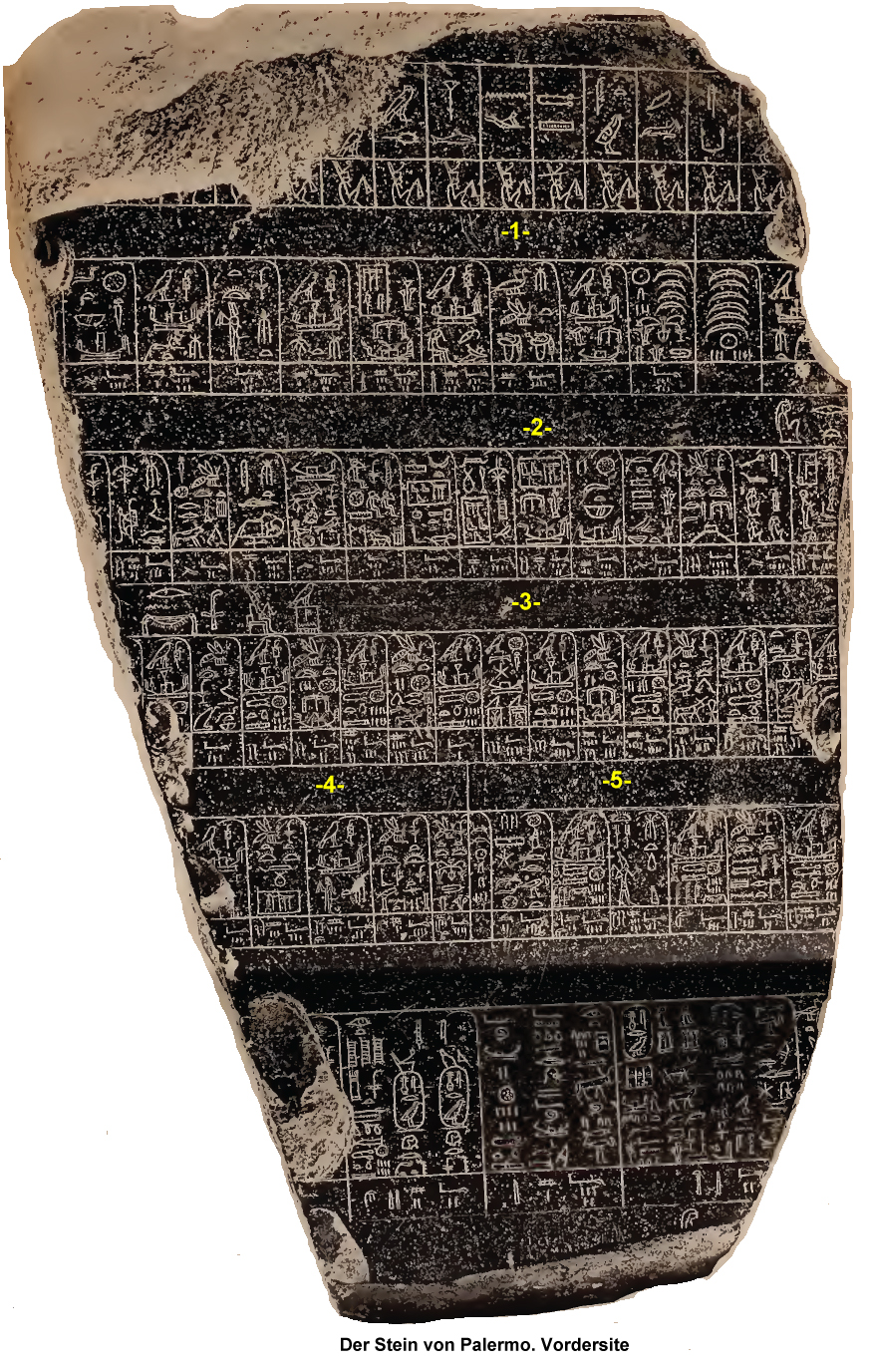
Palermo Stone, 5th Dynasty (2392 B.C.E-2283 B.C.E)

Across Egypt various nilometers could be found that recorded readings of the Nile's annual levels. A fragment of a recovered Egyptian stele "Royal Annals of the Old Kingdom" known as the "Palermo Stone" deemed to be from the times of the First Dynasty around 3,000 B.C.E. The Palermo Stone reports systems of measurements utilizing units such as cubits, palms, and fingers.

The ability to predict the volume of the coming inundation was part of the mystique of the ancient Egyptian priesthood. The same skill also played a political and administrative role, since the quality of the year's flood was used to determine the levels of tax to be paid. This is where the nilometer came into play, with priests monitoring the day-to-day level of the river and announcing the awaited arrival of the summer flood.

Religious attributes related to the Nile intertwined with the ideology or belief in Ma'at (a system of natural balance). Nilometers were accessible to only members of the city's priests and nobles. The restriction on who may access these structures ensured both accountability in proper readings and political control for the religious communities and ruling classes.

== Designs ==
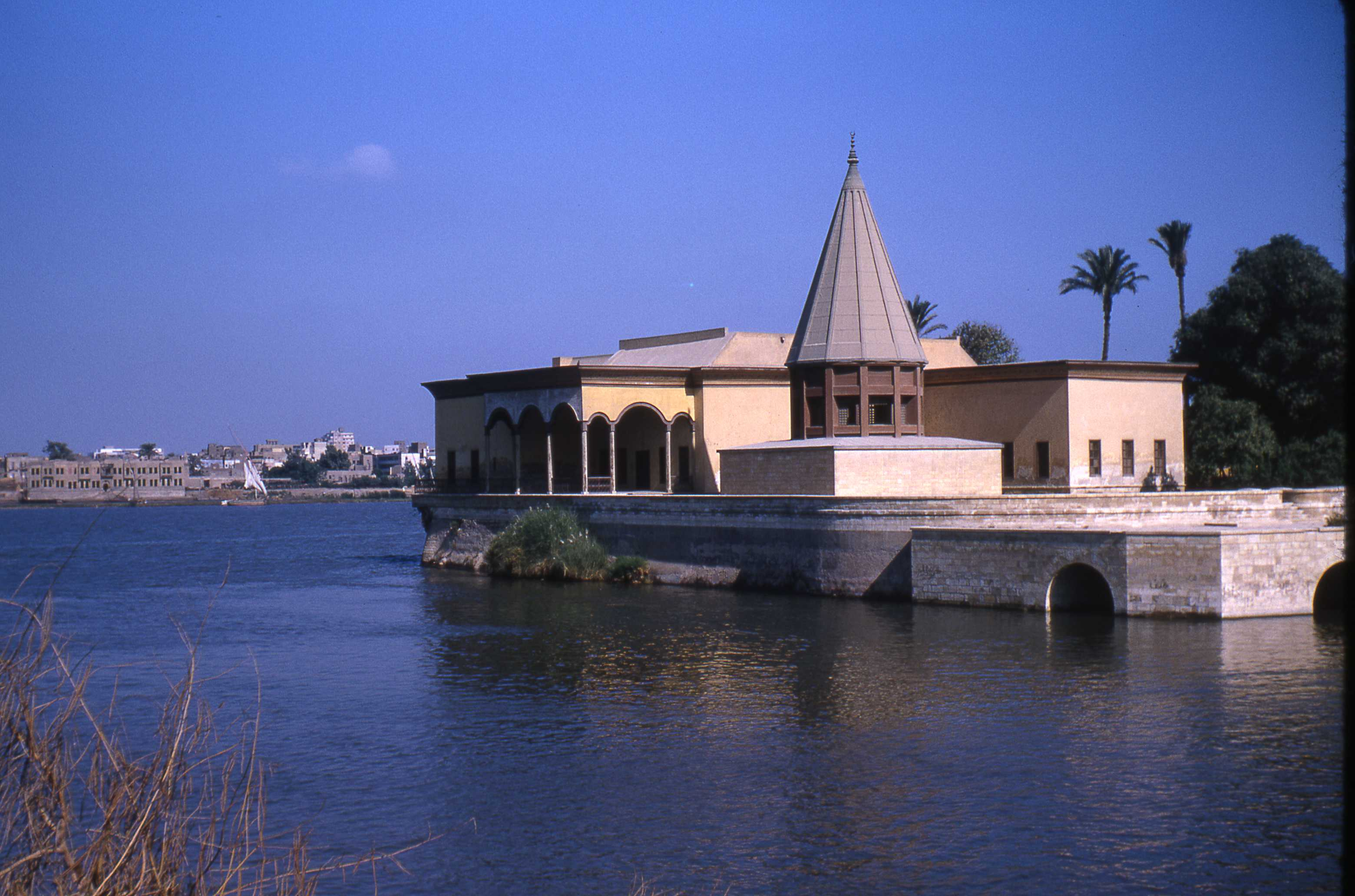
Conical structure covers the nilometer on southern tip of Roda Island in the Nile River at Cairo. The structure is modern but the nilometer dates from 715 AD.

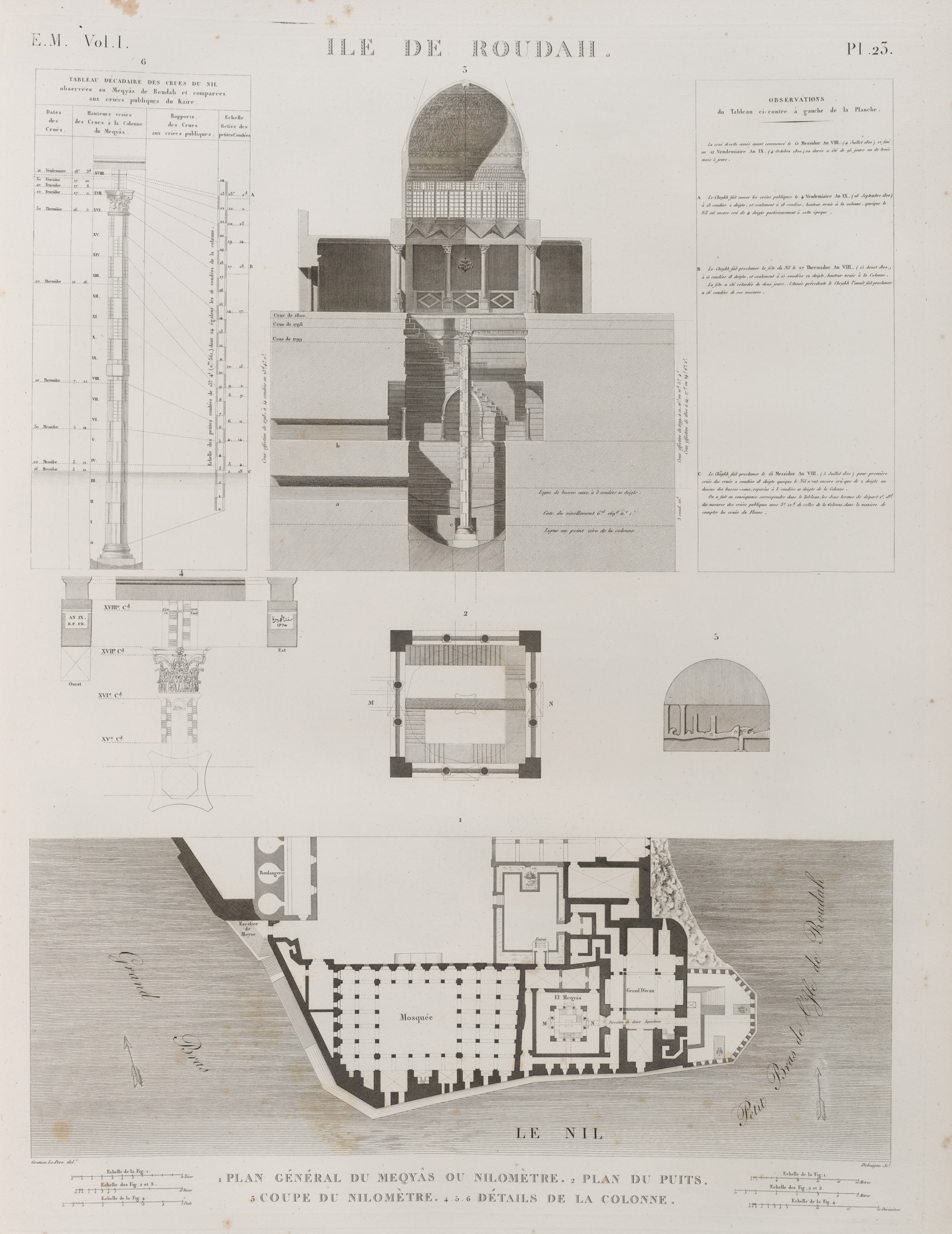
Diagrams of the nilometer on Roda Island c.1800

The simplest nilometer design is a vertical column submerged in the waters of the river, with marked intervals indicating the depth of the water. One that follows this simple design, albeit housed in an elaborate and ornate stone structure, can still be seen on the island of Roda in central Cairo (30.0069°N 31.2250°E). This nilometer visible today dates as far back as AD 861, when the Abbasid caliph al-Mutawakkil ordered its construction, overseen by the astronomer al-Farghani. Another nilometer had been ordered in 715 by Usāma b. Zayd b. ʿAdī, who was in charge of collecting the land tax (kharaj) in Egypt for the Umayyad caliph Sulaymān ibn ʿAbd al-Malik.

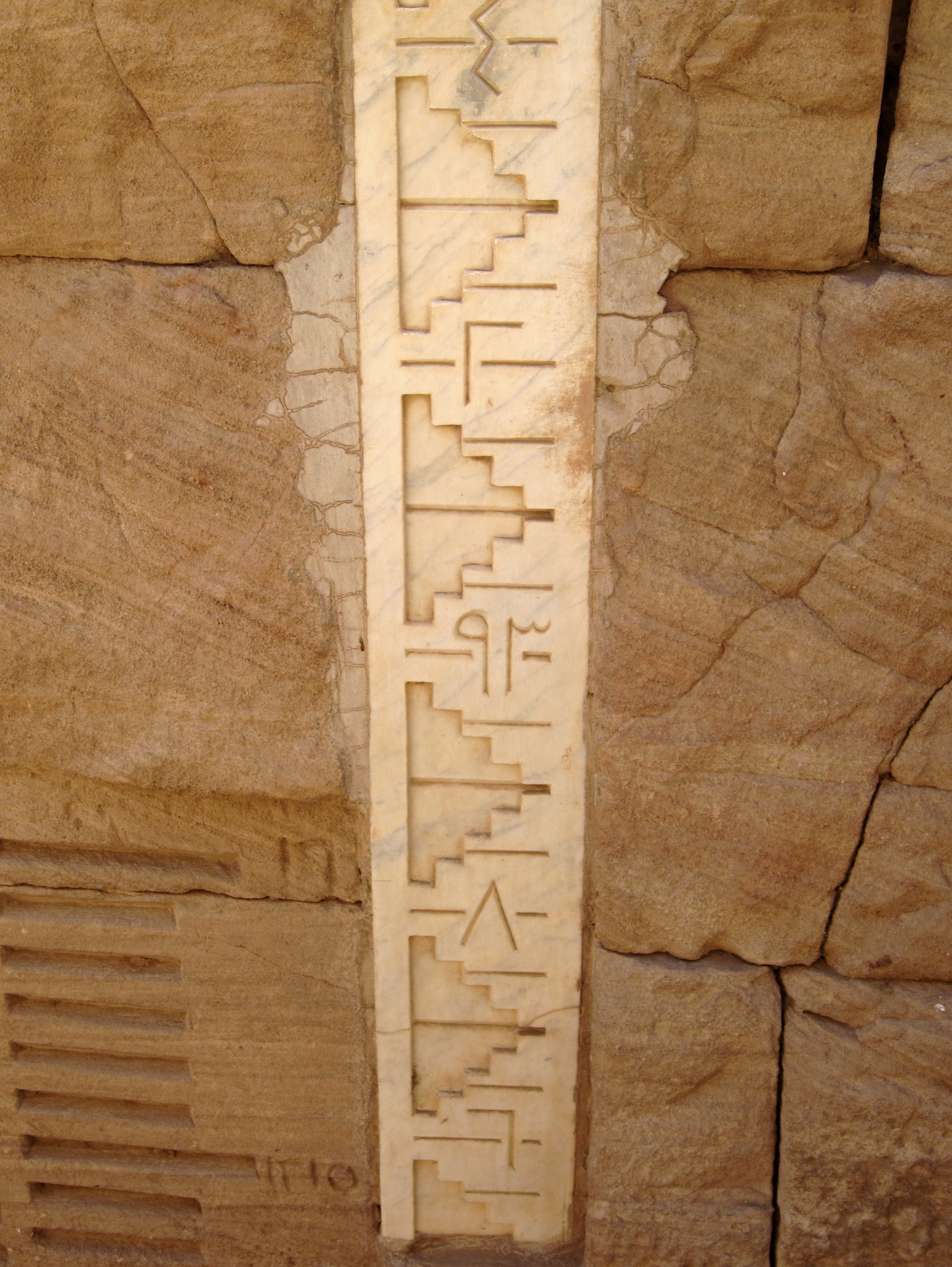
Nilometer on Elephantine Island

The second nilometer design comprises a flight of stairs leading down into the water, with depth markings along the walls. The best known example of this kind can be seen on Elephantine in Aswan, where a stairway of 52 steps leads down to a doorway at the Nile. This location was also particularly important, since for much of Egyptian history, Elephantine marked Egypt's southern border and was therefore the first place where the onset of the annual flood was detected.

The most elaborate design involved a canal or culvert that led from the riverbank – often running for a considerable distance – and then fed a well, tank, or cistern. These nilometer wells were most frequently located within the confines of temples, where only the priests and rulers were allowed access. A particularly fine example, with a deep, cylindrical well and a culvert opening in the surrounding wall, can be seen at the Temple of Kom Ombo, to the north of Aswan.

== History ==
While nilometers originated in Pharaonic times, they continued to be used by the later civilizations that held sway in Egypt. Some were constructed in Roman times. In the 20th century, the Nile's annual inundation was first greatly reduced, and then eliminated entirely, with the construction of the Aswan Dams. While the Aswan High Dam's impact on Egypt and its agriculture has been controversial for other, more complex reasons, it has also had the additional effect of rendering the nilometer obsolete.

=== Roda Island ===
The first nilometer on Roda Island was constructed by Usama bin Zayd bin Adl before Jumada II, 96 AH (February 715), during the reign of the Umayyad caliph al-Walid. The 14th-century Arabic historian Maqrīzī writes that the construction cost 24,000 dirhams. During the reign of Sulayman ibn Abd al-Malik, Usama wrote to the caliph informing him of the dilapidated state of the nilometer. He received a reply ordering him to construct a new one, which he did in 97 AH (5 September 715—24 August 716). Yaqut al-Hamawi, writing in the 12th–13th centuries, writes that in the beginning of year 247 AH (March 861), during Yazid ibn Abd Allah al-Turki's governorship of Egypt, the Abbasid caliph al-Mutawakkil had the 'new' nilometer constructed, and ordered that the privilege of measuring the river 'be taken away from the Christians.' The governor then appointed a man from Basra named Abu'r-Raddad who had emigrated to Egypt and taught hadith. He died in 266 AH (879/80), with Yaqut recounting "the supervision of the Nilometer has remained in the hands of his descendants until the present day" (which would have been around 1225 for the author). Ibn Khallikan, a 13th-century historian, gives a different account of this nilometer, recounting that a 'pious' muezzin in the old Mosque of Amr wished to carve inscriptions in various places of the nilometer. After consulting with Yazid ibn Abd Allah, Sulayman ibn Wahb and Hasan al-Khadim, the muezzin proposed to inscribe various Qu'ranic passages in the name of al-Mutawakkil. Sulayman ibn Wahb then wrote to the caliph, who replied in writing to choose verses of the Qu'ran 'most appropriate' to the nilometer and to inscribe the caliph's name.

Ibn Khallikan writes that the architect of the nilometer was Ahmad ibn Muhammad al-Hasib. Abu Ja'far al-Katib and Ibn Abi Usaybi'a mention that Ahmad ibn Kathir al-Farghani was sent to Fustat by al-Mutawakkil to supervise the construction. Abu al-Mahasin Yusuf (d. 1604) makes the same statement but calls him Muhammad ibn Kathir al-Farghani (full name: Abu'l-Abbas Ahmad ibn Muhammad ibn Kathir al-Farghani). For this reason, Gaston Wiet and Creswell argue that the al-Farghani and al-Hasib are the same person.

In 872–3 (259 AH), Ahmad ibn Tulun, the autonomous ruler of Egypt, had the nilometer restored. Al-Mutawakkil's name was removed from the Kufic inscription of the nilometer. K. A. C. Creswell states that the main inscription of the nilometer was probably tampered with by Ibn Tulun, saying "there can be little doubt that it was he who removed the name of the Abbasid Khalif." Ibn Tulun would however refrain from substituting his own name, with Creswell saying he may have not felt sufficiently secure to do so. Ibn Tulun, during 872-873, spent 1,000 dinars on works carried out on the nilometer. Consequently, according to Abdul Rofik Bruno, the Nile's irrigation would be enhanced, and agricultural output increased.

Amr ibn al-As, after the conquest of Egypt, reported to the Caliph Umar that when the Nile rose to 14 cubits there was a sufficient harvest, 16 an abundant harvest, 17 being the most advantageous height of all, and that at 18, one-fourth of Egypt would be inundated and usually be followed by plague. The Baghdad doctor Abd al-Latif al-Baghdadi, who traveled Egypt between 1192-1201, related similar measurements. In the exceedingly low water levels of 1201 and 1202, the nilometer remained dry. In 1201, the year commenced with a rise in 2 cubits before rising an average 15 16/24 cubits. In 1202, the year began with 1½ cubits before rising to 15 23/24 cubits. During the Abbasid Period, the nilometer was used to measure the river level and hence determine the rates of tax in Egypt.

In 1937, efforts to drain and excavate the nilometer were begun by Kamil Bey Ghalib, the Under-Secretary of State for Public Works, employing a new method used by Rothpletz and Lienhard. In this method, the mud could be removed completely and the structure examined.

Aerial view of Aswan Dam, Aswan Egypt

== See also ==
- Hunger stone
