= Sidi Gaber railway station =

Railway station in Alexandria, Egypt

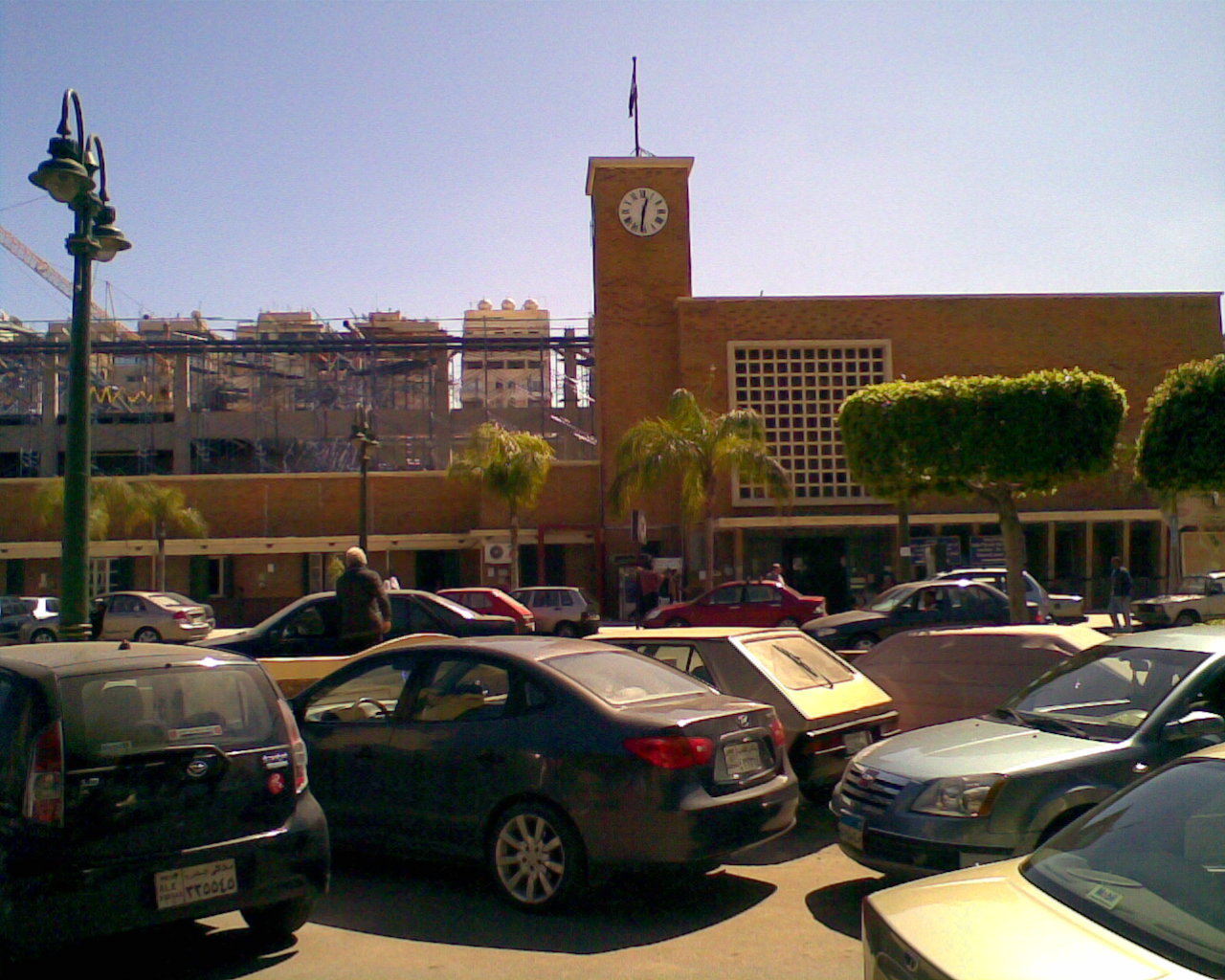
- The clock of Sidi Gaber railway station

General information
- Location: Sidi Gaber, Alexandria; Egypt
- Coordinates: 31.219371°N 29.942787°E
- System: Egyptian National Railways general passenger rail station
- Owner: Egyptian National Railways
- Lines: Alexandria-Cairo Line; Alexandria-Aswan Line; Regional rail
- Platforms: 4
- Tracks: 4
- Connections: Alexandria Tram Lines 1 and 2

Construction
- Structure type: At-grade
Location

Sidi Gaber railway station (Arabic: محطة قطارات سيدي جابر) is one of two main railway stations in Alexandria, Egypt.

It was constructed in the 1850s and is the oldest train station in Egypt.

== See also ==
- Alexandria
