= Sidi Gaber =

Sidi Gaber سيدي جابر
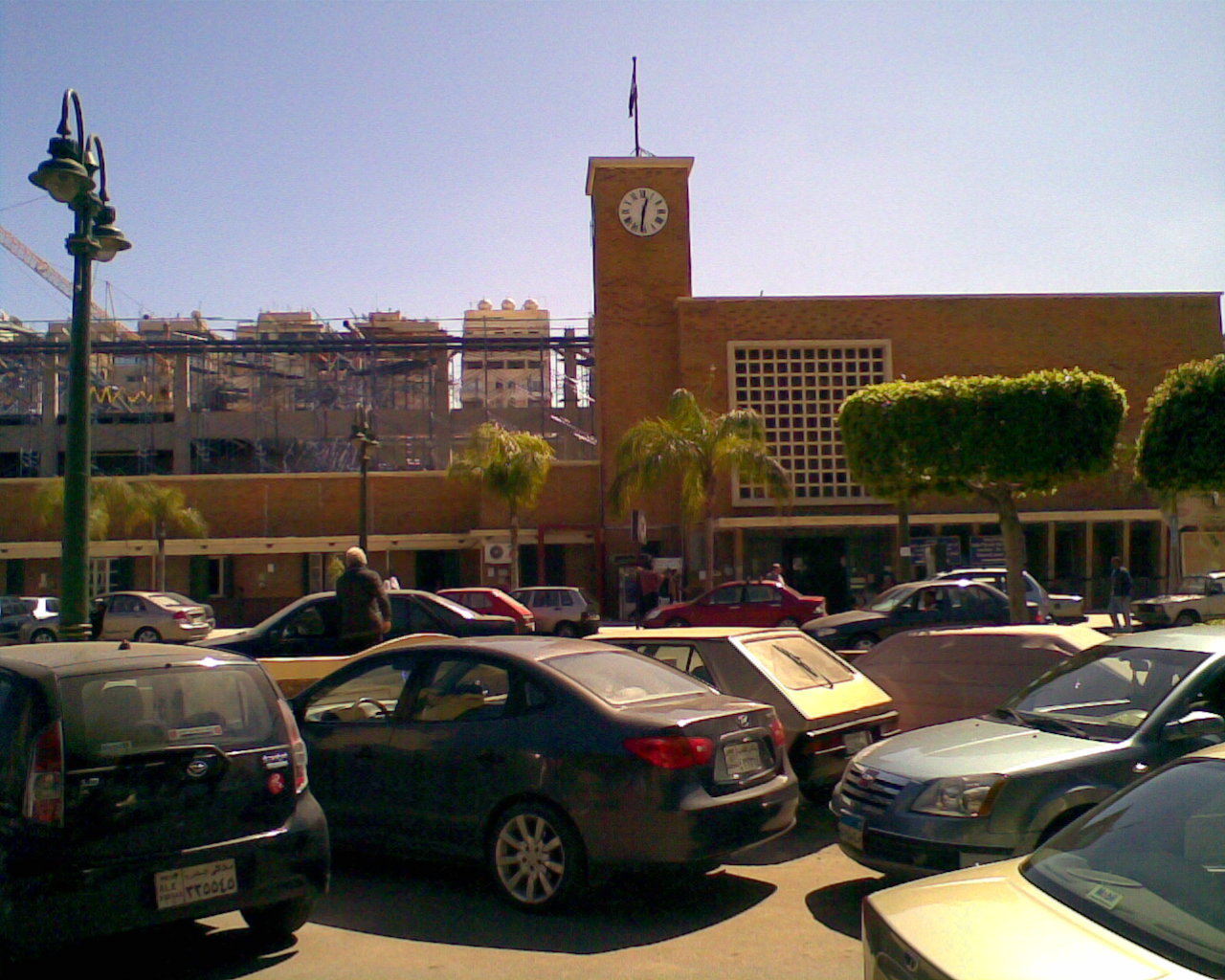
- The clock of Sidi Gaber railway station
- Interactive map of Sidi Gaber
- Coordinates: 31.221169°N 29.938073°E
- Country: Egypt
- Governorate: Alexandria
- City: Alexandria
- Time zone: UTC+2 (EST)

Sidi Gaber (Arabic: سيدي جابر) is a neighbourhood in Alexandria, Egypt.

The interior section of the neighborhood contains the Sidi Gaber railway station, the main rail entry point to Alexandria for most travelers. The station is one of the oldest in Egypt, having served the eastern regions of the city before their transformation into major urban districts (they had previously been summer resorts for foreigners and wealthy and middle-class Cairenes). As of 2011, the station is undergoing expansion, with the intent to turn old parts of the station into a railway museum, and include space for commerce in the newer sections.

== Archaeology ==
In July 2018, archaeologists led by Zeinab Hashish announced the discovery of a 2.000-year-old 30-ton black granite sarcophagus. It contained three damaged skeletons in red-brown sewage water. According to archaeologist Mostafa Waziri, the skeletons looked like a family burial with a middle-aged woman and two men. Researchers also revealed a small gold artifact and three thin sheets of gold.

== Military ==
The Sidi Gaber neighbourhood hosts the headquarters of the Northern Military Region of the Egyptian Army and the Armed Forces Hospital in Alexandria.

== Politics ==
The death of Khaled Saeed which triggered the 2011 Egyptian Revolution took place in Sidi Gaber Police station. Many protests took place in the area before the revolution and were dealt with brutally by the police.

== See also ==
- Sidi Jaber
- Death of Khaled Mohamed Saeed
